= The Adventures of François Villon =

Film series

The Adventures of François Villon was a series of four silent films released in 1914, directed by Charles Giblyn and featuring Murdock MacQuarrie as François Villon. The four films are The Oubliette, The Higher Law, Monsieur Bluebeard, and The Ninety Black Boxes. The films were based on a series of short stories about François Villon written by George Bronson Howard.

== The Oubliette ==
The Oubliette was released in August 1914 and features Murdock MacQuarrie and Lon Chaney. This film and By the Sun's Rays are two of Chaney's earliest surviving films.

=== Cast of The Oubliette ===
- Murdock MacQuarrie as François Villon
- Pauline Bush as Philippa de Annonay
- Lon Chaney as Chevalier Bertrand de la Payne
- Doc Crane as King Louis XI
- Chester Withey as Colin
- Millard K. Wilson as Chevalier Philip de Soisson
- Agnes Vernon

== The Higher Law ==
The Higher Law was released in September 1914 and features Murdock MacQuarrie and Pauline Bush. Lon Chaney also has a role. The film is now considered to be lost.

=== Cast of The Higher Law ===
- Murdock MacQuarrie as François Villon
- Pauline Bush as Lady Eleyne
- Doc Crane as King Louis XI
- Lon Chaney as Sir Stephen
- Millard K. Wilson
- Chester Withey
- William B. Robbins

== Monsieur Bluebeard ==
Monsieur Bluebeard was released in October 1914 in two reels.

== The Ninety Black Boxes ==
The Ninety Black Boxes was released in November 1914 in two reels and features Murdock MacQuarrie and Doc Crane.
