= The Oubliette =

1914 film

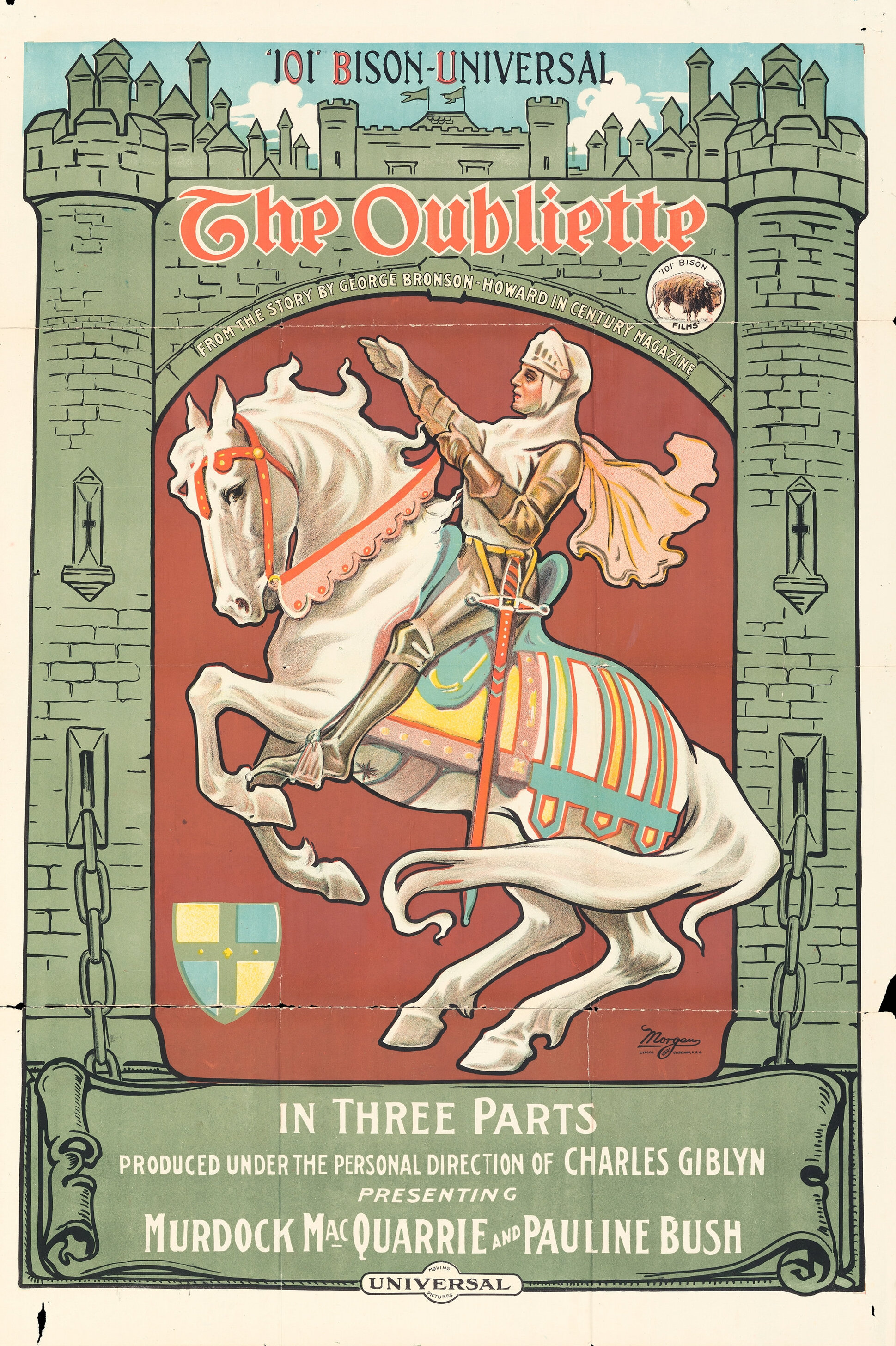
- Theatrical release poster
- Directed by: Charles Giblyn
- Written by: Harry G. Stafford; George Bronson Howard (story)
- Starring: Murdock MacQuarrie; Pauline Bush; Lon Chaney
- Cinematography: Lee O. Bartholomew
- Distributed by: Universal Pictures
- Release date: August 15, 1914
- Running time: 30 minutes (3 reels)
- Country: United States
- Language: Silent with English intertitles

The Oubliette (1914)

The Oubliette is a 1914 American silent historical drama film directed by Charles Giblyn, featuring Murdock MacQuarrie, Pauline Bush, and Lon Chaney. It is part one of a four-film series directed by Giblyn called The Adventures of François Villon. The Oubliette was written by Harry G. Stafford, based on a short story of the same name by George Bronson Howard published in The Century Magazine.

Of the four films in the series, Chaney appears only briefly in The Oubliette and reappeared as a completely different character in the second installment of the serial, The Higher Law, which is not known to survive in any archive. A still exists showing Chaney as Bertrand de la Payne moments before the character is killed in the sword fight. The film co-starred Millard K. Wilson, who became a lifelong friend of Chaney and later served as his director in films at M-G-M.

This film and By the Sun's Rays are two of Lon Chaney's earliest surviving films. The Oubliette was considered lost until the summer of 1983 when a nitrate print in excellent condition was discovered in Georgia. A couple rebuilding the steps of their front porch uncovered all three reels of the film, still in their metal cans.

== Plot ==
Francois Villon, vagabond, poet and philosopher, is on the road to Paris with his vagabond friend Colin when they see an elderly couple being evicted from their home. The two men turn over all their money to help the couple, but later, feeling hungry, they steal the purses of two monks. They are caught and arrested, but with Colin's help, Villon dresses as one of the monks and escapes. Colin is hanged and Villon is saying farewell to his friend's corpse dangling at the gibbet when the Chevalier de Soissons arrives and mocks the swinging corpse. Villon attacks and kills the knight and dons his suit of armor.

Philippa de Annonay is held prisoner at an inn by her wicked guardian, the Chevalier Bertrand de la Payne. Villon arrives at the inn and, hearing Phillippa call for help, tries to rescue her. De Payne is killed in the ensuing battle with Villon and his body is thrown off a second floor balcony. Phillippa is returned to her castle and Villon continues on to Paris.

King Louis XI wishes to test Villon's loyalty so he has the poet arrested and then, disguised as a convict, the king offers to help Villon escape if he will help him to overthrow the king. Villon denounces the man, affirming his support of King Louis. The King then reveals himself and Villon is knighted for his loyalty to the throne.

== Cast ==
- Murdock MacQuarrie as François Villon
- Pauline Bush as Philippa de Annonay
- Lon Chaney as Chevalier Bertrand de la Payne
- Doc Crane as King Louis XI
- Chester Withey as Colin
- Millard K. Wilson as Chevalier Philip de Soisson
- Frank Lanning as Oliver Le Dain
- Agnes Vernon

== Reception ==
Moving Picture World stated on 8/15/14: "A new series which is to follow a serial story running in the Century Magazine, it is extremely carefully staged and well-acted picture and very sure to attract attention. One of the best serial stories, judging by this first installment, that has been offered. It will make a hit in places where patrons want action and art in their pictures."

Moving Picture World stated: "The camera becomes a veritable magic mirror to us in this delightful picture of the days of Francois Villon...It is remarkable how convincing and like real human life these scenes from the long dead past are. Here we have men in armor behaving like real flesh and blood people, and we quite forget we are not contemporaries with them.... We can safely say that there is no obtrusive note of anachronism in the whole first installment. It has been produced in a reasonably scholarly way. Perhaps better than the staging even is the humanity of the characters...To sum up, we find the first installment of this picture a very entertaining romantic story, full of lively and naturally produced action, well-drawn characters, clear photographs and fairly scholarly staging. We commend it highly as a first-class offering and think that it will prove a door, as it were, to better work of this kind than we have had before as a general thing."
