= The Clock (1917 film) =

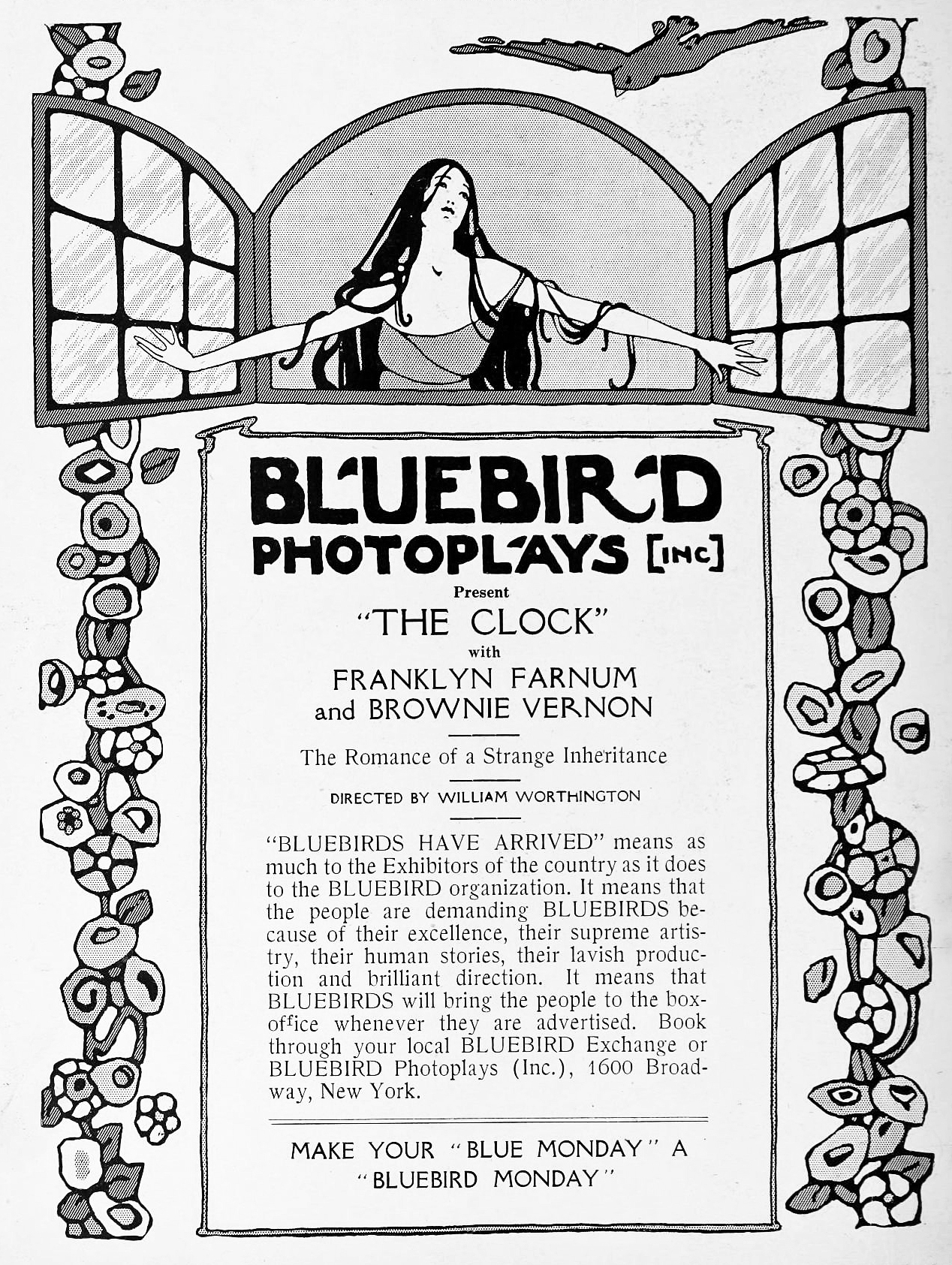
- Ad from The Motion Picture Weekly
- Directed by: William Worthington
- Written by: Maie B. Havey; Aaron Hoffman
- Produced by: William Worthington
- Starring: Franklyn Farnum; Agnes Vernon; Frank Whitson
- Cinematography: Friend Baker
- Production company: Universal Pictures
- Distributed by: Universal Pictures
- Release date: April 30, 1917
- Running time: 50 minutes
- Country: United States
- Languages: Silent; English intertitles

The Clock is a 1917 American silent comedy film directed by William Worthington and starring Franklyn Farnum, Agnes Vernon and Frank Whitson.

== Cast ==
- Franklyn Farnum as Jack Tempest
- Agnes Vernon as Vivian Graham
- Frank Whitson as Bob Barrett
- Mark Fenton as John Graham
- Fred Montague as George Morgan
- Willis Marks as Brandon
- Seymour Zeliff as Sam

== Bibliography ==
- Robert B. Connelly. The Silents: Silent Feature Films, 1910-36, Volume 40, Issue 2. December Press, 1998.
