= Agnes Vernon =

American silent film actress

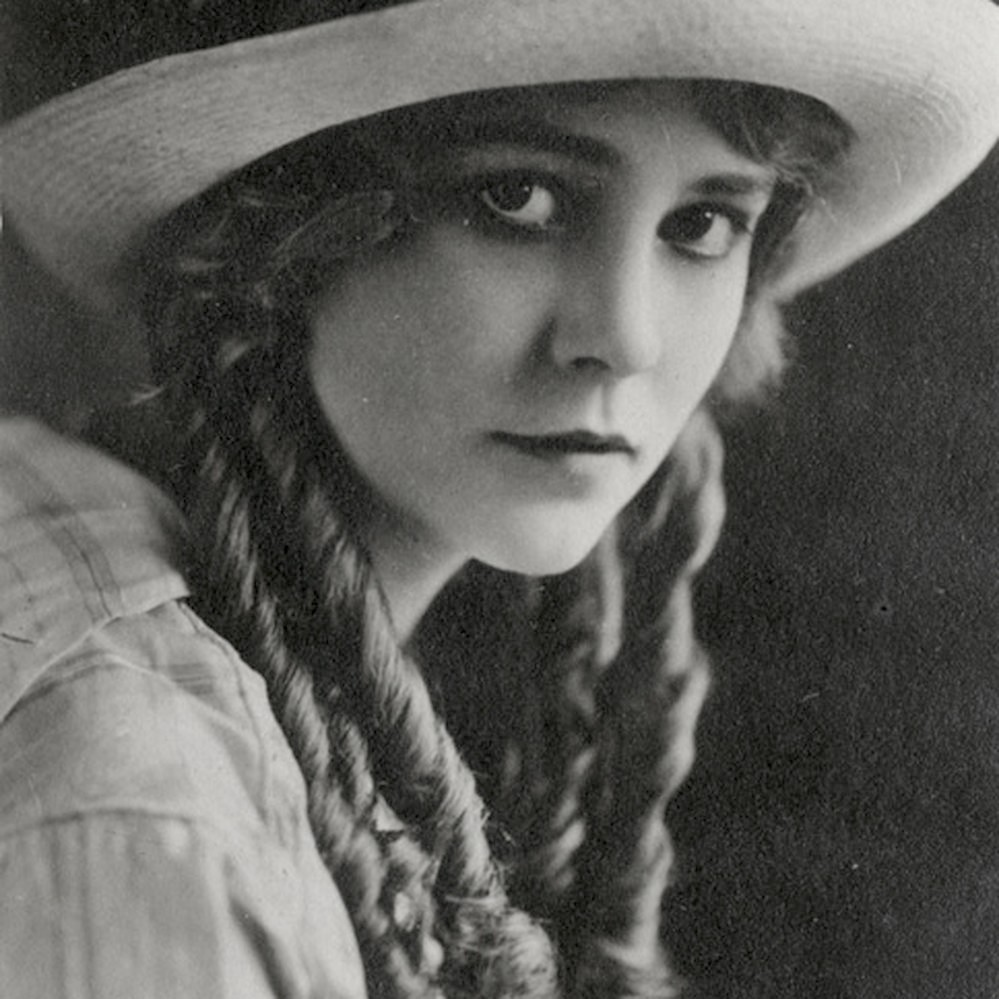
- Agnes Vernon 1914
- Born: December 27, 1895; La Grande, Oregon, U.S.
- Died: February 21, 1948 (aged 52); La Jolla, California, U.S.
- Resting place: Greenwood Memorial Park
- Other names: Brownie Vernon; Judith Vernon Wells; Agnes Wells; Agnes 'Brownie' Vernon
- Occupation: Actress
- Years active: 1914–1921
- Known for: Silks and Saddles
- Spouse: John K. Wells (m. 1923; died 1948)

Agnes Vernon (1895 – 1948) was an American film actress of the silent era. While still in her teens, she experienced a meteoric ascent from obscurity to box-office sensation. After turning twenty-three and a movie career fading away, she abandoned the silver screen forever. Vernon performed in over 90 films between 1913 and 1922. She completed most of her roles under contract with Universal Pictures.

Vernon was born into a pious Catholic household in La Grande, Oregon, on Friday, December 27, 1895. She attended convent schools in various cities, landing in Chicago while still a young schoolgirl. In 1913, while visiting a cousin in California, they took a tour of Universal Studios. While watching the filming of a motion picture, the film's director asked her to become an extra. At first, reluctant because she had no previous stage training, she finally agreed and took her early steps to film fame and fortune.

Murdock MacQuarrie took the young actress under his wing. Vernon rose from film extra to leading lady in 6 months. She would develop fan-favorite screen pairings with actors Franklyn Farnum and Herbert Rawlinson. 1916 became her watershed year, defined by her extensive film output and the number of leading roles.

In 1919, she traveled to Australia to make three films. She made her final return to America in 1922, having already married Director John K. Wells. Her rapid rise and fall all happened within a decade. She is hardly remembered today like so many actors of the silent period.

== Early life ==
This golden-haired girl with those big brown eyes was born Agnes Vernon to an Irish Catholic family in La Grande, Oregon, on December 27, 1895. (Note: Agnes Vernon's birth year - Sources showed Agnes Vernon's birth year was somewhere between 1895 and 1897. Trade journals started using the birth year 1896, which eventually became the de facto standard. There were never any disputes regarding the birth date of the twenty-seventh of December. Thus, most fan magazines used a birthdate and year of December 27, 1896. Inquiries to the city of La Grande, Oregon, and the Oregon State Archives, attempting to get an official birth certificate proved problematic. Record keeping before 1921 was sketchy. Instead of state or city verifications, the following sources were used to verify birth: Passport application for Agnes Vernon stated a birth date and year of December 27, 1895. The affidavit is solemnly sworn and signed by Agnes Vernon in 1919.; California Death index has a stated birth date of December 27, 1895.; Her burial marker displays dates of 1895–1948.) Vernon lamented "she has never received any birthday presents because her friends give them all to her on Christmas Day." Vernon also stated "there was nothing particularly interesting about her childhood. I was perfectly normal. I went to school, played with dolls, and had an occasional spanking to break that monotony of my life."

Vernon claimed her family moved around the country. They eventually landed in Chicago, where Vernon enrolled in a convent school. After some time, they moved to Kansas City, where she attended another convent school that instilled a strong sense of discipline. After she was "finished," she moved to California with her mother.

In an article published in the Sacramento Star dated January 6, 1917, Agnes Vernon, in her own words, wrote, "It happened that I was spending a summer in California with a girl whom I had known in Chicago. Universal City was one of the trips arranged for me. We were watching the making of a scene on the big stage. A Director discovered he needed one more girl for a small bit. He looked around at the visitors and asked if I would try the small part for him. At first, I declined and finally consented. As the cameraman began to grind and the Director called his instructions, I was fascinated. The lure of the game had caught me." As Edmunds points out in his book - BIG U - Universal in the Silent Days "Casting at Universal, before things became more businesslike, was somewhat casual. A passing face, a friend visiting the set, or an odd happening that caught a director's eye — all these, as well as direct applications — often led to successful movie careers. This was not unusual. The Gish sisters got their start because they dropped in to see Mary Pickford one day at Biograph."

Vernon had previously claimed, "I had always had a sneaking desire for the other side of the footlights." After her movie experience, Vernon acquired an intense desire to be in films, but her prim mother would not hear of it.

Now Vernon would have to convince her mother to change her mind about an acting career. In Vernon's own words, "Then I decoyed her out there again, and she began to see its advantages. She realized the reasonable hours of the actors and their out-of-door existence. The chance of living, as she expressed it, 'like a Christian instead of traipsing all over the country,' gradually converted her to the idea of letting me try my luck." Even though she had no stage experience or Universal contacts, she had this all-consuming desire to succeed. Vernon got her name on an "extra list" at Universal City.

== Career ==
Breaking into the Movies
– by Agnes Vernon

If there ever was a girl who had no desire to go into movie pictures, I think I was that girl.

— The Sacramento Star dated Jan 6, 1917

Most fan magazine articles agree; Vernon started her movie career as an atmosphere player in March 1913. She was 17 and barely a year out of convent school. Those uncredited roles are unknown and, consequently, not listed in her filmography.

Universal distributed most of her films. They were well-received because she collaborated with specific actors like Murdock MacQuarrie, Herbert Rawlinson, and Franklyn Farnum. Her pairing with Herbert Rawlinson would make them the most popular stars on the Universal list.

Another facet of her film performances was her willingness to perform all sorts of athletic feats that her role required. An article in the Moving Picture Weekly pointed out, "She does everything that even a screen actress can be asked to do — rides, drives, runs a car, swims, dives, dances, plays any and every game, and will perform stunts with the best of the daredevils if the director says so. She jumped out of a third-story window to put a punch in the picture, one time, and in another, she dived off the deck of a steamer into the ocean."

Her early works at Universal were all short films, as was the trend. She acted in her first feature film in 1916. Then, between 1917 and 1919, Vernon made eleven more feature films. Vernon departed Hollywood in September 1919 and traveled to Australia. She would act in three feature films in Australia, then retire from acting, never to return.

=== 1914 ===
The first credited movie role for Agnes Vernon was the 3-reel short film (Note: Short Film - There are no defined parameters for a Short film except for one immutable rule -the film's maximum running time. The Academy of Motion Picture Arts and Sciences defines a short film as "an original motion picture that has a running time of 40 minutes or less, including all credits".) Bison production of The Triumph of Mind, starring and directed by Lois Weber. The film was released on May 23, 1914. Vernon plays the part of Daisy – a Wayward Girl. This film was Vernon's introduction to Ella Hall and Rupert Julian. Another Lois Weber production, Avenged, also released in May.

An article in The Universal Weekly dated December 26, 1914, stated, "Out in Universal City is a wonderful man who has taken a wonderful, bright, golden-haired little girl under his wing. The wonderful man is Murdock MacQuarrie, and his eighteen-year-old charge is Agnes Vernon."

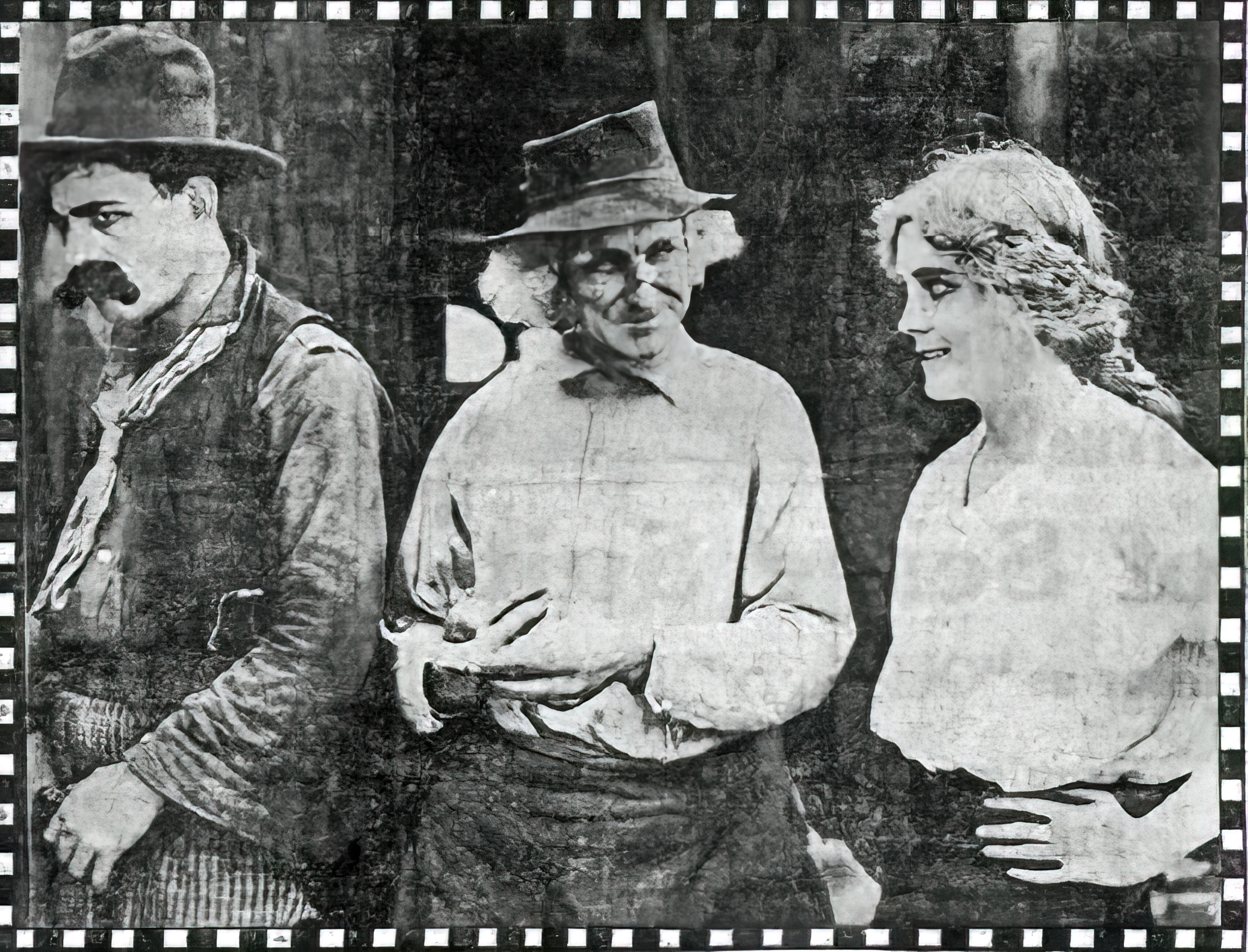
1914 The Old Cobbler Cast with Lon Chaney on the left; Murdock MacQuarrie middle;18-year-old Agnes Vernon on the right

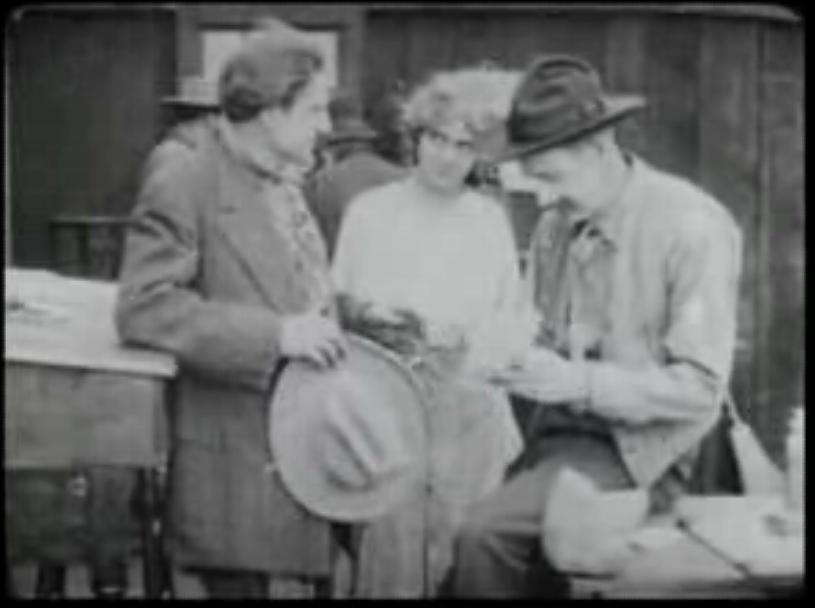
1914 By The Sun's Rays with Murdock MacQuarrie on the left; 18-year-old Agnes Vernon; Seymour Hastings on the right

MacQuarrie's decision to mentor Vernon would develop into a pivotal event in her motion picture career. Even though she had limited theatrical experience, he gave her a part in one of his upcoming films. He allowed her to learn the fundamentals of acting "on the job." Her first role in a MacQuarrie-directed project was the 2-reel film The Old Cobbler, distributed on June 27, 1914. The 35-year-old MacQuarrie plays Nathan — the old cobbler. Nathan moves out West and befriends Wild Bill, played by Lon Chaney. Wild Bill has a sweetheart and local dancer named Jess, played by 18-year-old Agnes Vernon.

Vernon would make another 11 movies with MacQuarrie in 1914 and 20 more films in 1915, ending with The Tinker of Stubbenville, released on June 24, 1915. Vernon released 16 short films in 1914, all distributed by Universal. The majority had Murdock MacQuarrie as the lead. In 1914, she performed under the management of 5 directors: Lois Weber, Murdock MacQuarrie, Charles Giblyn, Otis Turner, and Joseph De Grasse.

Vernon's last film in 1914 was the MacQuarrie-directed film, When It's One Of Your Own, released on December 29, 1914. MacQuarrie plays Heinrich Gerhardt, a German Musician, and Agnes Vernon plays his daughter. Vernon received top billing as a female lead. She would make 32 films with MacQuarrie, or nearly one-third of her total film output.

In 1914, Vernon also performed in several films with Lon Chaney, including The Old Cobbler, A Ranch Romance, By the Sun's Rays, and The Oubliette. By the Sun's Rays has survived and is available on the Internet Archive The Oubliette, released on August 15, 1914, was the first movie in a 4-part serial — The Adventures of François Villon directed by Charles Giblyn. Vernon likewise performed in the fourth film of the 4-part serial—Ninety Black Boxes, released on November 21, 1914. The Oubliette is also available on the Internet Archive.

=== 1915 ===
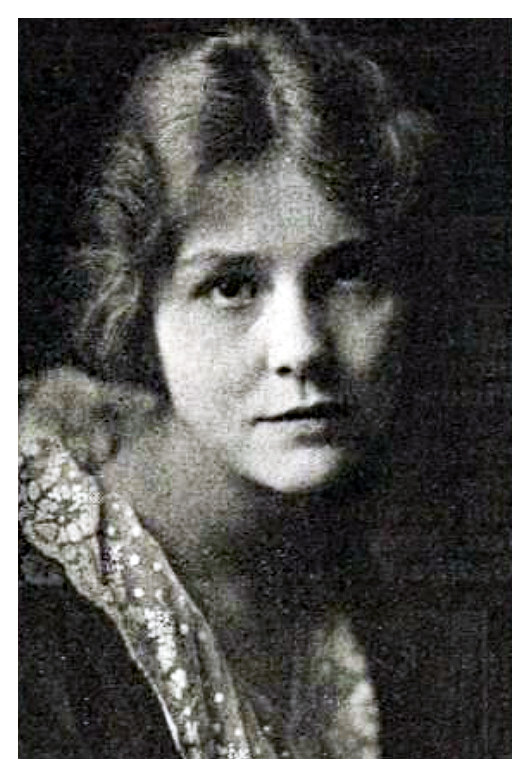
Agnes Vernon 1915 issue Moving Picture World

As I.G. Edmunds points out in his book BIG U - Universal in the Silent Days, "The year 1915, although a great year for Universal as a leader of the motion picture industry, was not a good year financially for the industry as a whole. The European war cut down on foreign sales of movies. Also, domestic prices were increasing across the board. At the same time, the cost of production was in an inflationary spiral."

By 1915, feature films (Note: A feature film or feature-length film is a narrative film (motion picture or "movie") with a running time long enough to be considered the principal or sole presentation in a commercial entertainment program. A film can be distributed as a feature film if it equals or exceeds a specified minimum running time and satisfies other defined criteria. The minimum time depends on the governing agency. The American Film Institute and the British Film Institute require films to have a minimum running time of forty minutes or longer. Other film agencies, e.g.,Screen Actors Guild, require a film's running time to be 60 minutes or greater. Currently, most feature films are between 70 and 210 minutes long.) were becoming more of the trend in Hollywood. By 1915, over 600 feature films were produced annually in the United States. However, Universal was not ready to downsize its short film business. There was a recurring claim that Carl Laemmle was the longest-running studio chief resisting the production of feature films. After all, short films were cheaper, faster, and more profitable to produce than feature films.

In January 1915, Vernon's life took an unexpected twist. It started with a publicity-seeking marriage proposal by a newspaper reporter. Vernon shocked everybody by accepting the offer, kick-starting a chain of events over four months. The entire sequence of events is examined in the marriage section of this article.

Vernon's 1915 film output would increase to thirty-five short films. This year would become the highest film production of her entire movie career. This total included another twenty films with Murdock MacQuarrie. 1915 would become Vernon's introduction to Hobart Henley in the film Jane's Declaration of Independence, released on July 3, 1915. The (Henley • Vernon) pairing would only produce five short films.

As Edmunds also observes, "At this time Universal was very strong on teams. Groups developed almost into stock companies with the same director, actor, actress, and supporting cast. Laemmle believed that if the public liked a certain girl and boy, they would like them in another picture."

Vernon was assigned to the William Worthington company in mid-1915. This assignment started a continuing professional relationship with the director and actress. Over Vernon's movie career, her relationship with Worthington would produce twenty-two films, including six feature films. The film Misjudged, released on August 31, was Vernon's first movie, directed by Worthington and starring Herbert Rawlinson. The (Worthington • Rawlinson • Vernon) combination would only produce three films in 1915, but the screen chemistry would result in another eleven films in 1916 and three features in 1917.

Another significant event occurred in early 1915. At 10 am on Monday, March 15, 1915, 10,000 people applauded as Carl Laemmle, president of the universal film manufacturing company, unlocked the gate to Universal City. It was a realization of Laemmle's dream to build the world's only city devoted solely to motion picture production. Company executives and movie stars greeted them as they passed through the gate. In the afternoon, the actors returned to their movie sets and resumed work on their projects as fans watched.

=== 1916 ===
" Adjectives in Ads are Necessary"

Every star is unknown until advertised, and every star is, in a very great majority of instances, created by advertising.

— Robert H. Cochrane dated January 25, 1919

Feature films were the future, but Universal continued to resist. While advertising short films in the trade journals, Universal might include a section titled – "The Universal Programs" situated atop the movie ads, espousing the advantages of continuing to show short films. (Note: Universal's advertising their short films in the May 1916 issue of The Motion Picture News, the introduction read: — The moving picture business is here to stay. Some of these wise ones will tell you that business has picked up since they went into features, — BUT — ask them whether they are talking NET or GROSS. The man who is packing 'em in and losing money on features is envied by his competitor, who is laying by a bit every day, and has a good steady, dependable patronage but admits to a few vacant seats at some performances. When this chap wakes up, he will realize that he has a gold mine and that good advertising will make it produce to capacity. The moral is that if you can tie up to the Universal Program, DO IT. If you can't NOW, watch your first chance. Let the people know what you have and let the feature man go on to ruin if he wants to.)

In 1916, Vernon acted in twenty-three pictures, including twenty-two short films and one feature-length production. Universal produced these films, and Vernon was featured prominently as the lead female. Her celebrity was rising, as noted by the first appearance of 1-page and 2-page spreads in trade journals.

William Worthington, directed almost half her movie output in 1916, all of which featured Herbert Rawlinson in the lead. During Vernon's movie career, her professional relationship with Worthington produced twenty-two films, including six feature films.

In 1916, she performed in two films with Franklyn Farnum, but the screen chemistry would bloom in 1917 when they continued to make six more movies. Farnum would become Vernon's introduction to comedy.

Agnes Vernon's first Bluebird film (Note: What is Universal Branding — Major film studios owned many movie houses. This enabled them to have guaranteed outlets for their products. Since Universal owned none, they needed a solution advising exhibitors on the type of movie they received. Universal responded by forming a three-tier branding system for their films based on the size of their budget and status. In the book The Universal Story, Hirschhorn describes the branding as "the low budget, Red Feather programmers, the more ambitious Bluebird releases, and the occasional Prestige or Jewel production". An article in The Moving Picture World explains the Bluebird moniker - We adopted the name of Bluebird Photoplays because this company is the harbinger of the very best that can be produced in features. A Motography article dated April 28, 1917, announced - A new brand of feature photoplays will be offered for release, though Universal exchanges under the brand name of Butterfly Pictures. The Bluebird and Butterfly branding was the brainchild of Carl Laemmle, and both brands exposed his faddish philosophy of "... THE PLAY is always greater than the star". This branding was Laemmle's rather blatant attempt to blunt the proliferation of the star system he had created. Laemmle's filmmaking perspective did not last long. The ticket-buying audience he serviced went to the movies to see their favorite stars, not the vehicle allowing them to perform. The branding system had a brief existence and by 1920 had faded away.) was A Stranger From Somewhere, released on November 13, 1916. William Worthington directed the picture and Franklyn Farnum was in the lead. This Bluebird release was the only feature film Vernon made in 1916. During her career, Vernon would star in sixteen feature films, and Franklyn Farnum would be the leading man in five of these films. Besides Worthington, she worked with an additional eight directors in 1916. Universal released ninety-one feature films in 1916 including fifty-four Bluebirds.

One of her last scheduled appearances in 1916 was to play Caroline in the Rupert Julian Bluebird production of The Right to Be Happy. Because of the injuries suffered in a car accident (see the next section), she could not fulfill this obligation, and Universal selected Roberta Wilson to play the role.

==== The accident ====
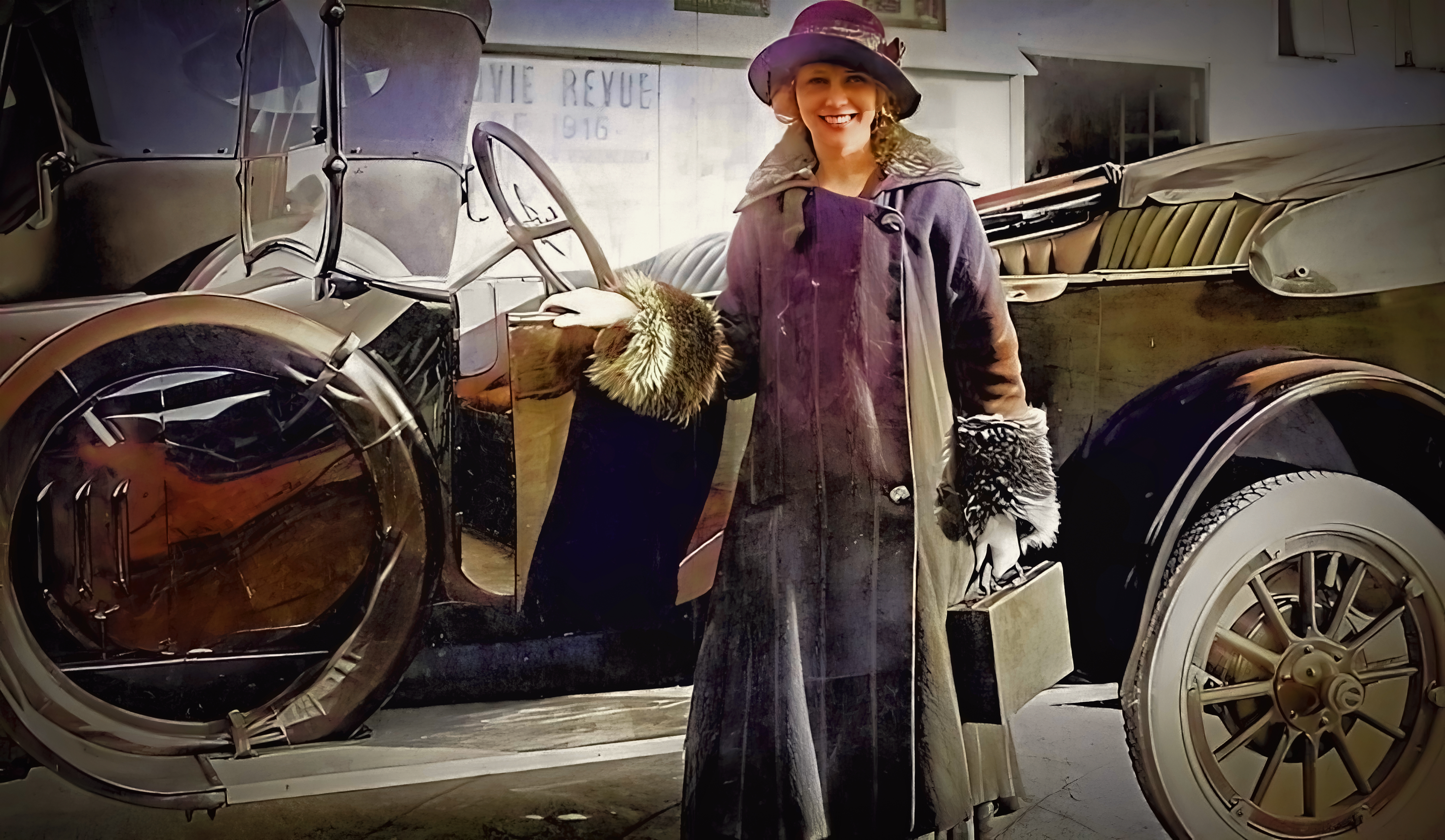
1917 Brownie Vernon's Stutz Bearcat

In mid-December 1916, 20-year-old Agnes Vernon, 29-year-old Eddie Laemmle, 49-year-old Bill Gillis, and Fred Robinson piled into a convertible automobile. They were members of the William Worthington company of Bluebird players. Vernon was in the front passage seat; the actual driver was never identified. The group planned to drive West from Universal City to a location near Chatsworth, California. Upon their arrival, they would explore sites for a new Western film. The accident happened after Thursday, December 7, 1916, and before Sunday, December 17, 1916.

Unknown circumstances caused the car to plunge into a ditch. Since Vernon was in the front seat, the impact threw her entirely out of the vehicle. The December 23, 1916 issue of the Moving Picture Weekly said "She was thrown from an automobile when it was going at a rapid rate of speed, and although not seriously injured, suffered a nervous shock which made her appearance at the studio impossible."

Another article reported in Los Angeles Evening Post-Record January 1, 1917, recounted, "For several days Agnes Vernon ... was confined to her home following injuries she received when thrown from an automobile."

A third article published in the Moving Picture Weekly dated January 27, 1917, headlined "Agnes Vernon Thrown from Auto." The official publication of Universal then stated: "For several days, Agnes Vernon, known as Brownie, who plays one of the leading roles in Director William Worthington's company in the forthcoming bluebird The Man Who Took a Chance was confined to her home, following injuries, she received when thrown from an automobile." The article finished using the phrasing "Eddie Lammle, Bill Gillis, and Fred Robinson was also "spilled" but escaped with merely a few bruises." Both articles offered a curious use of the word "spilled".

At the time of the accident, Vernon lived with her mother. Since Vernon was restricted to her home for several days following her injuries, her mother would help nurse her back to health.

Another harrowing automobile adventure would occur in 1917 while shooting A Stormy Knight. Franklyn Farnum and Vernon would drive together to and from the filming location on the summit of Mount Wilson. One day, the brakes gave way while traveling down the narrow road from the summit. The Moving Picture Weekly news item gives a detailed description of the wild ride down a mountainside. Fortunately, there were no injuries.

==== Accident's impact ====
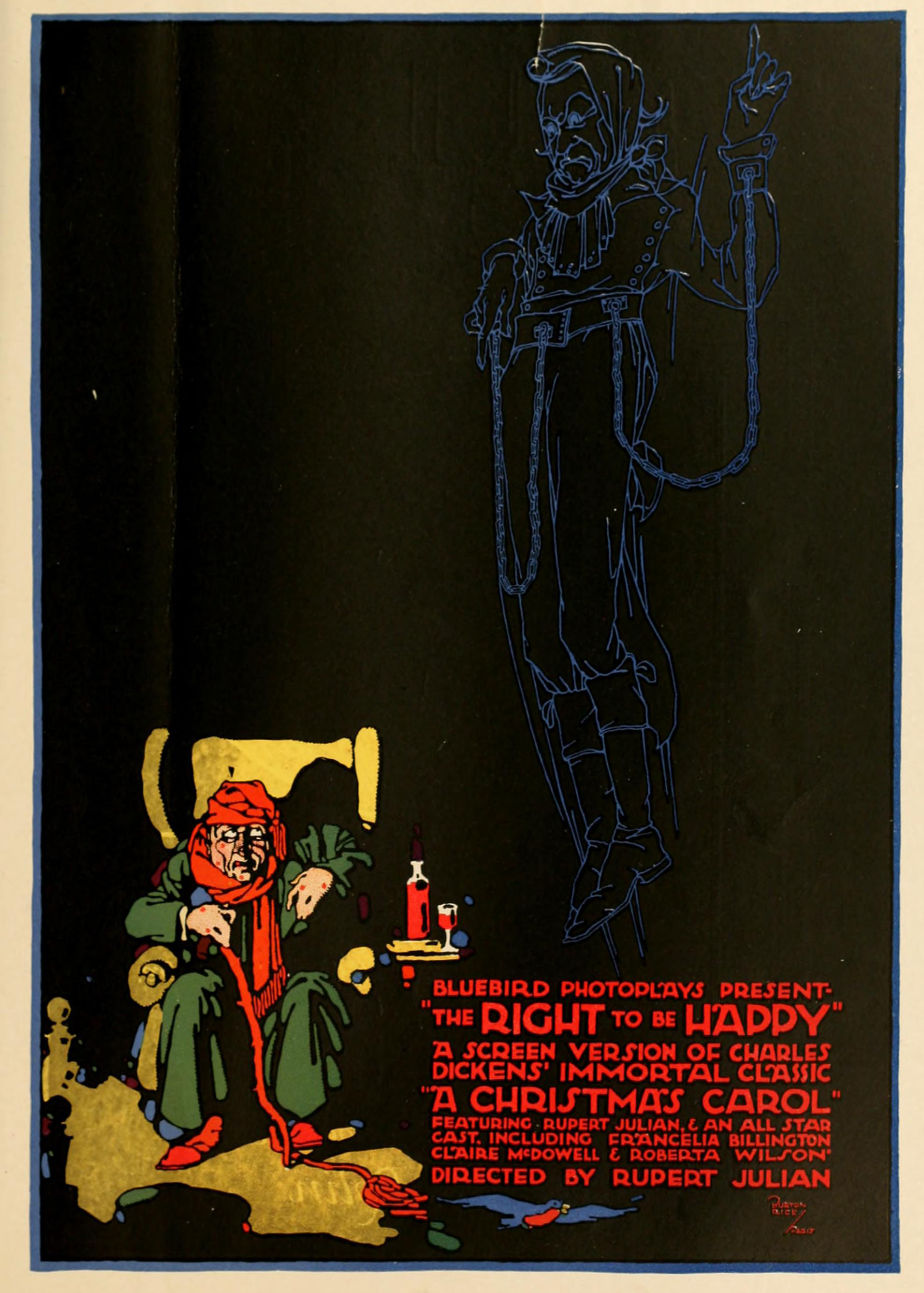
Her injuries prevented her from playing Caroline

Vernon's second scheduled feature film for 1916 was to be the Bluebird production of The Right to Be Happy. Universal planned this film to be the high point of the Christmas season. Rupert Julian directed the film and assumed the leading role of Ebenezer Scrooge. Most movie ads and articles claimed the leading ladies for the film were Francelia Billington and Agnes Vernon. Vernon was to play the role of Caroline, whose scenes would be the last to be filmed.

A December 2 article in Billboard stated Universal moved the film's release date from December 18 to December 25. Although the postponement was no fault of Vernon's, at the last minute, Roberta Wilson assumed the Vernon role in the film. Although no known news items cite the accident as the reason for Vernon's replacement, the circumstances are highly coincidental.

An article in the Motion Picture Weekly stated "Production of the five reel comedy-drama – Face Value, which features Franklyn Farnum and Agnes Vernon, has been delayed because of an accident which befell Miss Vernon." The film, renamed The Man Who Took a Chance, was released on February 23, 1917. The accident caused some costly production delays for the two films.

=== 1917 ===
The movie industry continued to reshape itself, including implementing more cost-cutting measures. Part of the increased expense of making movies was the upward trend of churning out more feature films. As Codori states in his book Film History Through Trade Journal Art, 1916-1920, "The year 1917 was not a good Financial year for Universal, despite the successful pictures that were made. The entrance of the United States into the European war caused prices to rise, squeezing Big U's profits. Then a number of male actors rushed off to join the army, causing other disruptions. The higher cost of the five-reel features of Bluebird and Red Feather further drained the treasury. Laemmle asked his actors to take a cut in salary."

This observation flew while an article in a trade journal reported a seemingly different situation. The back page headline in The Moving Picture World article dated September 22, 1917, read "Universal Increases Forces." The article stated, "More additions have been made to the acting and forces at Universal City during the past month than at Any Similar Period throughout the present year."

Vernon's film output for the year would drop to 13 productions, but this total included nine feature films. Vernon opened 1917 by performing in two short films. She would act in two more short pictures released in July. These four films would be the last short movies she ever made. Starting in February, Vernon continued to make seven Bluebird and three Butterfly feature films. Her last three films in 1917 reunited Vernon with her former lead Herbert Rawlinson.

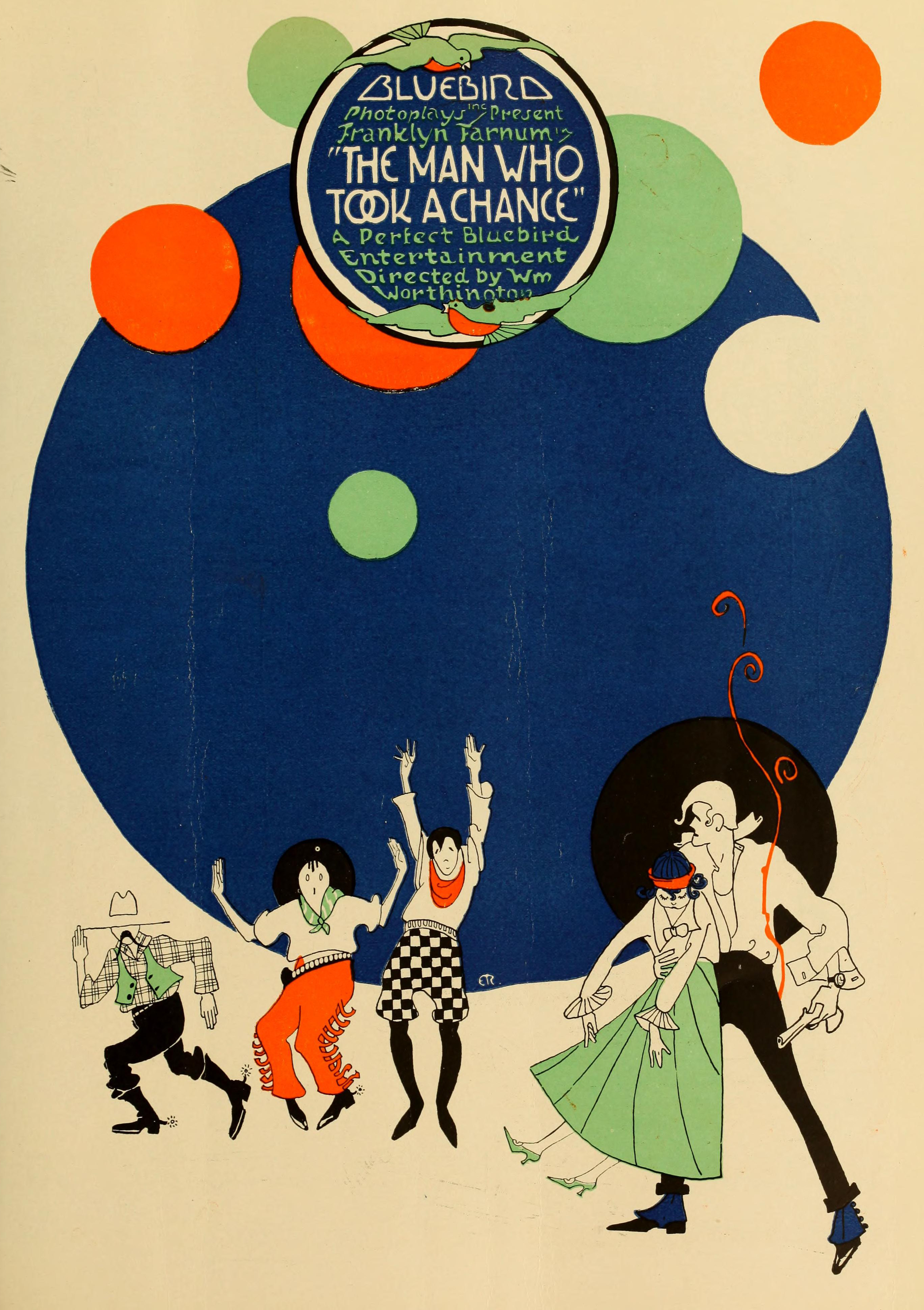
Movie poster
The Man Who Took a Chance

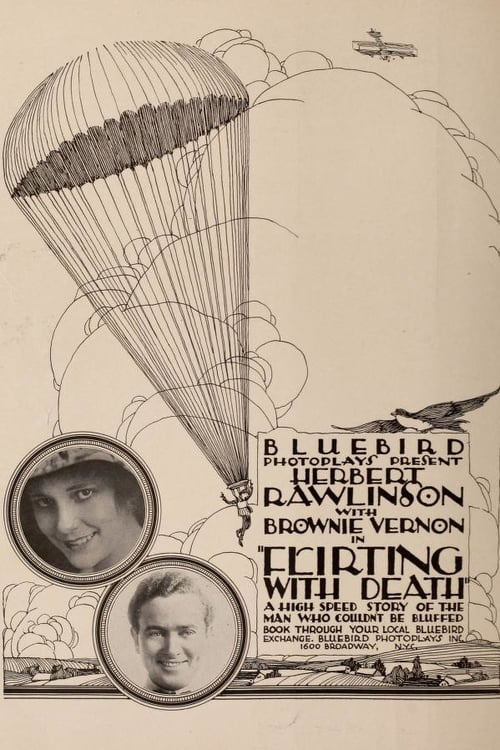
Movie poster
Flirting with Death

The Bluebird comedy The Man Who Took a Chance, starring Franklyn Farnum, was released on February 19, 1917. This production was only Vernon's second feature film. Two more Bluebird comedies followed — The Clock and Bringing Home Father, with the same cast and director.

In mid-1917, Agnes Vernon informed Universal she had permanently changed her prenomen from Agnes to Brownie. Vernon's baptismal name was Agnes, but even with her long, cork-screw blonde curly locks, her friends called her "Brownie". The nickname referred to her prominent brown eyes and her fondness for wearing brown apparel. After her announcement, she wanted her screen credits to read "Brownie Vernon". Bringing Home Father released June 4, 1917, marked the first time Vernon's screen credit reads "Brownie Vernon" instead of "Agnes Vernon".

In the Fall of 1917, 45-year-old director William Worthington departed Universal, moved to New York, and went to work for Goldwyn. Before his departure, he completed directing three Bluebirds featuring Farnum and Vernon. The first was Bringing Home Father. The Car of Chance released on July 9, and the last film, The Clean-Up, had an August 6 release date.

After Worthington's departure, Carl Laemmle selected 27-year-old Elmer Clifton as Worthington's replacement. Clifton started as an actor in 1912, acquiring roles in various D. W. Griffith projects. Griffith and Joseph Henabery mentored him personally. Although Clifton was an actor with no prior directorial experience, Universal gave him the high-profile assignment of directing Bluebird films. The first film that Clifton bore the sole responsibility for directing was the Bluebird production of The Flame of Youth, released on June 16, 1917. His next film was Midnight Man, released on August 13, 1917.

A Stormy Knight, released on September 9, 1917, would only be the third film Clifton directed. The movie starred veteran actor 39-year-old Franklyn Farnum and 21-year-old Brownie Vernon. It would become the last film Vernon made with Farnum before he would become a "lone star." Clifton's fifth film was Flirting with Death released on September 18, 1917, attempted to cash in on the previous successful pairing of 31-year-old Herbert Rawlinson and Vernon. During the filming of Flirting with Death, director Clifton set a new record for scenes in a five-reel film. Clifton was said to have filmed 927 scenes for the film, double the number normally found in a feature film of this length.

In November, Universal released Fear Not featuring Rawlinson, directed by Allen Holubar, and reconnected Vernon with Murdock MacQuarrie (in a minor role). Holubar had directed only six films before this feature.

The High Sign was released on December 16, 1917, starring Rawlinson and directed by Clifton. An article in The Motion Picture News dated September 29, 1917, states – the set was "one of the costliest settings ever erected for a five-reel motion picture." (Note: Clifton's costly settings — One of the costliest settings ever erected for a five-reel motion picture was built recently the Bluebird Pacific Coast Studios for Director Elmer Clifton's latest production, It's Up to You. most of the action of the story is laid in an imaginary European principality, and many exterior sets of a specific type of architecture were constructed. The largest of these is the palace of the princess, which stands behind a massive stone wall forty feet high. A deep moat skirts the wall and is spanned by a drawbridge sturdy enough to sustain the weight of a cavalcade of horses and carriages. In the construction of this set alone, fifty-five thousand feet of lumber was used for the framework, and twenty tons of plaster and five thousand feet of metal lath were required to dress the surfaces. Fifteen barrels of paint gave the walls the proper appearance of antiquity. A corps of city-skilled scene builders worked industriously for two weeks before it was ready for the camera.) This movie was the last film Vernon made for Universal.

In the mid-teens, the movie industry was realigning itself, including Universal. However, Vernon seemed to be getting all the work she could handle. The back page headline of an article published in The Moving Picture World dated September 15, 1917, read: "Brownie Vernon is a Busy Lady." Vernon's last two films were Butterflies. Many of the trade journals still called them Bluebirds. Some authors have suggested Butterflies were the new "Red Feather" films or that Butterflies were a step below Bluebirds. Universal promoted Bluebird as a prestige division – Butterfly was supposedly a little less prestigious Considering the star power, they assigned to the Butterfly line - "Butterfly's galaxy of stars will be found in the line-up either late in December or in January bills. Ella Hall, Harry Carey, Louise Lovely, Molly Malone, and Little Zoe Rae now comprise the fixed stars of Butterfly." - this was probably not true.

Her last two pictures were both successful and involved loads of hard work. Both movies had Vernon as the female lead. In fact, in Fear Not, she was the main headliner. As Dr. Delamoir points out in her article on Louise Lovely, "Universal's management was keen to keep its stars in line and, during 1916 and 1917, some stars were forced to appear in less prestigious short films, including westerns. One of Universal's strategies for controlling and disciplining stars was to shove them into the less-prestigious brands."

In late 1917, the media called it the Universal "canning" spell. As part of the process, the news articles reported that Universal management had asked Vernon to play "atmosphere" in a specific production. Vernon thought this request was beneath her status as a Universal leading lady. Rather than kowtow to a demeaning Universal management request, she packed up her "makeup boxes and wardrobe" and walked out. Universal promptly canceled her contract after her departure.

It was well known that "Carl Laemmle, president of Universal, had little use for stars, even though his advertising had helped to create them." Asking Vernon to play an extra would equate her to an unproven new employee. However, requesting an established star to "play atmosphere" is a thin excuse for them "pack up," void their contract, and skedaddle.

Upon closer examination, Vernon's purported reason for leaving was a small detail of a much larger state of affairs. No creditable sources have surfaced that frame a broader motive behind Vernon's exit. The big question remains, how did Carl Laemmle let bankable talent leave Universal unless there were irreparable conditions beyond mitigation? And lastly, did Bluebird stars have any leverage in any negotiations? In the book Universal Women: Filmmaking and Institutional Change in Early Hollywood, Cooper stated: "In early 1917, no other Universal director even began to approach Weber's track record as a maker of profitable feature films. More interestingly, the other directors to whom the company most frequently entrusted its Bluebirds in 1916—and continued to employ most regularly in the following year—generally lost money." There is little doubt Vernon was a respected movie star, yet she had not reached the summit of picturedom and the rarified air that is superstardom.

=== 1918 ===
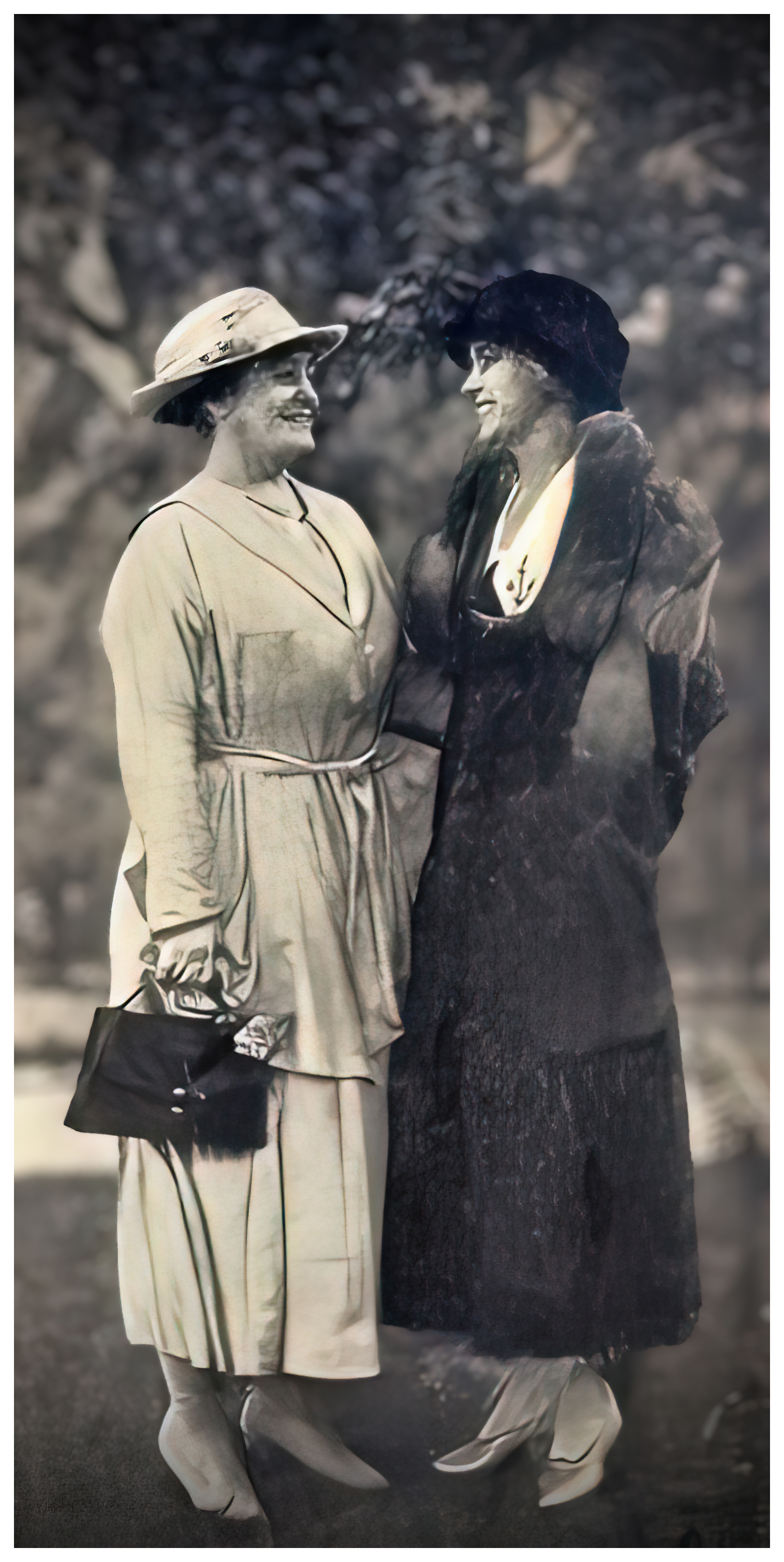
Vernon's Mother

In 1918, a global pandemic introduced itself to the world. The "Spanish Flu" would permanently change the movie industry.

At the beginning of 1918, Brownie Vernon was 22 years old. She had been part of the movie industry since she was 18. She was single, living with her mother, and a jobless free agent actress.

The media claimed after she departed from Universal, she started working for Liberty films. Records indicate she made no credited appearance in any Liberty films nor any films for any production company during 1918. The media claimed she spent a portion of 1918 recovering from an illness. The particular ailment was never specified.

Other events would make 1918 a year to remember. Great War in Europe, better known as World War I, ended on November 11, 1918. The troops were coming home. When the doughboys returned, they carried a pernicious present from abroad — the Spanish flu. "Two years later, nearly a third of the global population, or an estimated 500 million people, had been infected in four successive waves."

The influenza pandemic's effect on the movie industry was swift and severe. Sick people did not attend movie theaters. Attendance dropped precipitously, and many independently owned theaters closed. Reduced attendance and closed theaters meant less money to make movies and pay actors. The vicious cycle had started and would reshape the industry again.

=== 1919 ===
Vernon made a limited return to Hollywood in 1919. Brownie Vernon still had name recognition after her prolonged absence from Hollywood. Her next acting opportunity came in early 1919. Tom Mix, the "King of Cowboys," planned to make another one of his stunt-filled western movies.

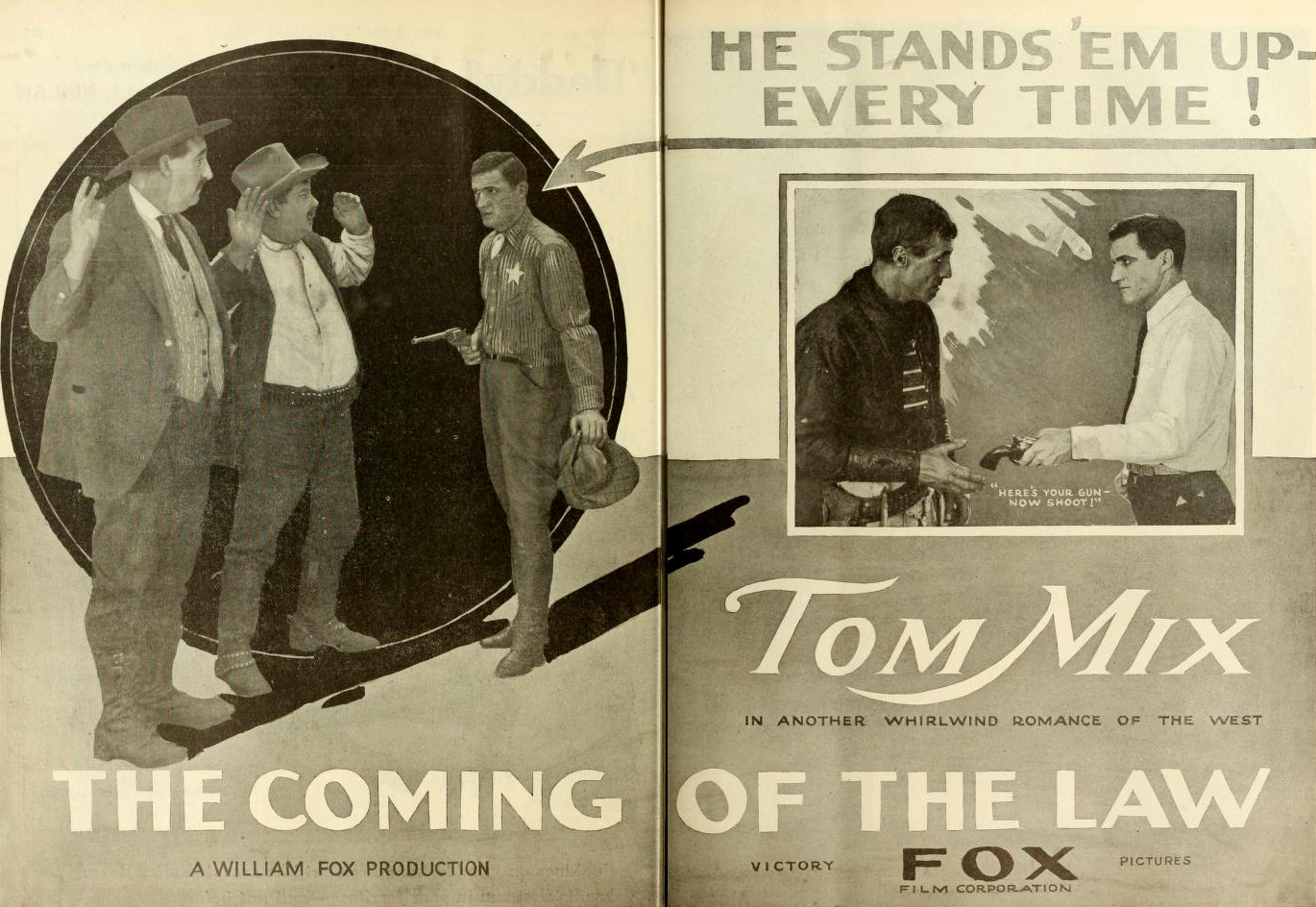
1919 The Coming of the Law

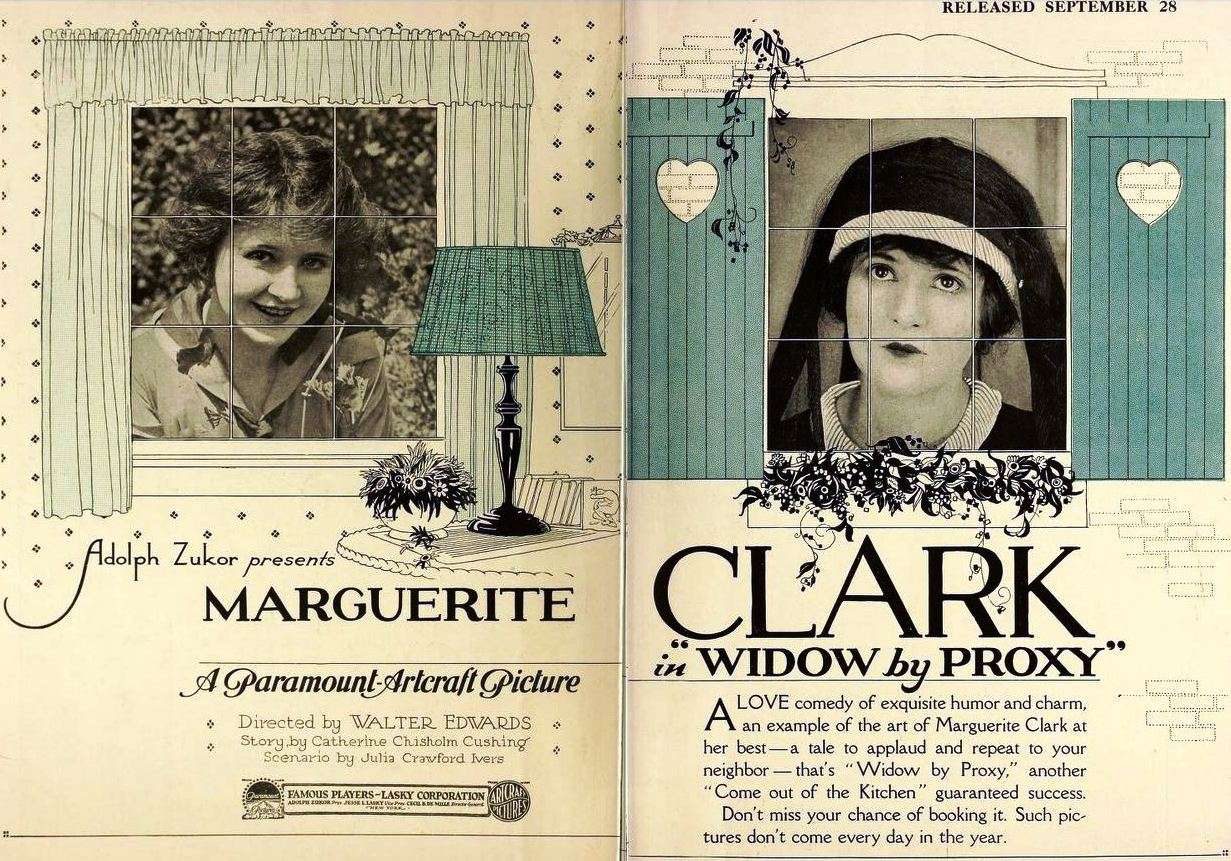
1919 Widow by Proxy

Fox offered to fund this project. He needed a leading lady who could satisfy the demands of the film and would do what was necessary to make the film look realistic. Their first choice was Brownie Vernon, especially with her willingness to perform her own stunts. Fox released the Western titled The Coming of the Law on May 11, 1919. The film was directed by Arthur Rosson and Tom Mix was the leading man The film received good reviews.

On the heels of her return to the motion-picture industry, another Western followed — the Robinson-Cole's production of Bare-Fisted Gallagher released on June 22, 1919. This film featured William Desmond in the lead.

Vernon would make her last American-made feature film in August. The Paramount Pictures project Widow by Proxy featuring Marguerite Clark, was released on August 28, 1919. Upon completing this production, Vernon packed her suitcases and sailed for Australia to make bush movies. After her return from the Land Down Under, she permanently retired from the movie industry.

== Post Hollywood ==
=== Australia ===
The first American contingent of film experts included Director Wilfred Lucas, his wife screenwriter Bess Meredyth Lucas, actress Brownie Vernon (Note: Copy of the Contract terms - TheThis Agreement entered into this 17th day of July 1919, at Los Angeles, County of Los Angeles, state of California, United States of America, by and between Reginald Baker and E. J. Carol both of the city of Sydney, state of new south Wales, Australia, hereinafter known jointly as the first party, Agnes Vernon, of Los Angeles, County of Los Angeles, state of California, hereinafter known as the second party Witness: For and in consideration of the sum of ten dollars ($10) each to each in hand paid, the receipt of which is hereby acknowledged; 1. The first party does engage the second party to act, and the second party does agree to act in motion pictures to be made in Australia during the month of September, October, November, and December 1919 for the first party under the direction of Bess Meredyth and Wilfred Lucas, and in any pictures made by these directors on route to Australia and returning from Australia to the United States of America, during the life of this agreement. 2. The first party requests and the second party agrees to give to the first party her exclusive services as an actress during the life of this agreement. 3. The second party agrees to act in whatever scenes requested by the said directors, to be prompt and faithful in the discharge of her duties as an actress and said pictures, and to furnish all modern wardrobes as that term generally is understood among motion picture actors and directors, except such articles as maybe of a special or unusual character. 4. The first party agrees to pay the second party a weekly salary of one hundred dollars ($100), together with transportation from Los Angeles to Sydney and return to Los Angeles; said salary is to be paid from the date of leaving San Francisco, California, which sailing date is now printed and published being August 12, 1919, and ending on the day of arrival in San Francisco on the return voyage. 5. The life of this agreement may be extended by mutual agreement between the parties hereto before December 1, 1919. Signed Reg L. Baker and E. J. Carol and witnessed by Agnes Vernon Sign, seal, and delivered this 18th day of July 1919) and Cinematographer John Doerrer and arrived in Sydney on September 2, 1919. These professionals were personally recruited by Snowy Baker and approved by E. J. Carroll. They went to work immediately, beginning with research (Note: Meredyth's research - After arriving in Australia, Bess Meredyth spent time in the Mitchell Library searching for new material to develop movie plots with an Australian slant. She later explained to the Royal Commission on the Moving Pictures that "the only truly national subject about which producers could make a picture in Australia was horse racing". Meredyth also said "Australians have not yet developed any distinctive individuality of national character or tradition.") and location scouting. Meredyth's conclusion prompted Lucas and Baker only to produce Australian bush pictures.

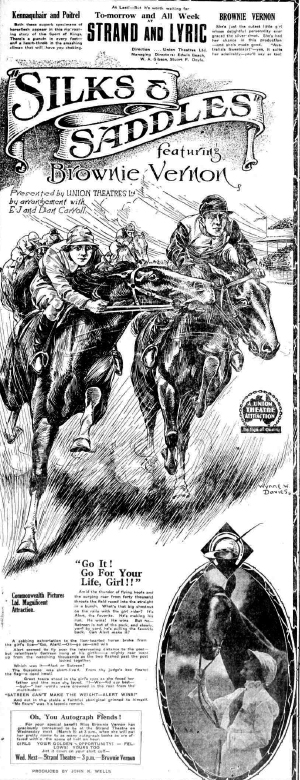
Newspaper Movie Ad

- The Man from Kangaroo (Jan 1920)

The fruits of the Lucas contingent resulted in a trio of films. The first film was The Man from Kangaroo, released in Australia on January 24, 1920. The film featured Snowy Baker, directed by Wilfred Lucas and written by Bess Meredyth. The film's leading lady was Agnes Vernon. They list John Wells as one of the assistant directors and a film editor. The 73-minute feature film was produced by E. J. Carroll and Snowy Baker. The film was shot on location in Kangaroo Valley during September and October 1919. The film was a success at the box office. The movie was repackaged for the American market, renamed to The Better Man and premiered in New York on November 1, 1921. This was the only movie of the trio of Lucas films to survive.

Newspaper Movie Ad

- The Shadow of Lightning Ridge (Apr 1920)

The second film of the American troupe was The Shadow of Lightning Ridge, released in Australia on April 3, 1920. The feature was directed by Wilfred Lucas and written by Bess Meredyth. The film's featured leads were Snowy Baker and Agnes Vernon. John Wells is listed as the assistant director. The seven-reel feature film was produced by E. J. Carroll and Snowy Baker and their production company, Carroll-Baker Australian Productions.

Filming started early 1920 in the bush near Sydney, and at a studio built by E. J. Carroll. The film was well received in Australia and successful at the box office. The film was released in the U.S. under the same name on September 13, 1921, by William Selig and Aywon Film Corporation. It is considered a lost film.

The Carrolls folded their production company after completing this film. They said "Lack of Australian stories suitable for dramatization and the fact that oversea producers were releasing films more than sufficient for market needs had also forced him and his associates to abandon the production of films."

- Silks and Saddles (1921)

Silks and Saddles was John K. Wells's big opportunity. Wells wrote, directed, co-edited, and produced the picture. The movie featured Wells's wife Brownie Vernon and Robert MacKinnon. They set the film in the world of horse racing.

The newly formed Australian company, Commonwealth Pictures, and The Carroll Brothers provided funding of £5,600 (approximately $250,000 in today's money) to finance the movie. The film was released on March 5, 1921, and garnered good reviews. The film would eventually gross £50,000 (over two million in today's U.S. money). The Americanized version of the movie was renamed Queen o' Turf or Queen of the Turf and released in the United States on April 16, 1922. The film is one of the rare Australian silent movies to survive today.

== Marriage ==
Agnes Vernon and John K. Wells joined in matrimony in 1921, and their union endured for a span of 27 years. Prior to marrying Wells, her engagement to Abe Duce garnered significant media attention in 1915.

=== Abe Deuce ===
Letter to Editor of Los Angeles Record
I have visited many moving picture theaters throughout the country and learned to admire the beautiful girls I have seen on the screen. I have been wondering whether they are as lovely as they look and whether they really have hearts that could be one in real life. I have plenty of money. Would you be able to refer me to anyone who could give me some idea about this?

— Abe Deuce
January 4, 1915

Abe Deuce was a special writer for the Newspaper Enterprise Association. In 1915 he hatched a plan for a new series of feature stories. His scheme involved meeting multiple young movie starlets, establishing connections with them, proposing marriage, and subsequently crafting in-depth narratives about his encounters following their rejections.

- January 4, 1915—Wanted: love; Abe has coin; girls kid him

Deuce wrote a letter to the editor of the Los Angeles Record (see insert). The editor assigned the task to a staff writer, and she drove Deuce to the Universal lot. She introduced him to a publicity manager — Don Meany. Meany was sympathetic to his pursuit and stated he will introduce him to two ingenues tomorrow.

- January 5, 1915—He Doesn't Want Much! - A Movie Queen Bride

Deuce's first article is a 1300-word installment describing his introduction to 19-year-old actress Brownie Vernon and 17-year-old actress Helen Leslie.

- January 6, 1915—Agnes eyes in Helen's hands set Abe's heart afire

"Today is the day, and I popped the question – will you marry me? Since I was in love with both girls, I asked them both."

- January 7, 1915'—Abe, cold-shouldered Thrice; realizes that Brownie is the only girl

Deuce is introduced to 18-year-old actress Ella Hall and 31-year-old actress Cleo Madison. "These two girls, as charming and talented as they are, remain in my life, but it's a short time."

- January 8, 1915—Abe Deuce meets the angel of his dreams

Deuce is introduced to 20-year-old actress Signe Auen. "Never before had I seen such a vision of feminine loveliness as had just entered the record office."

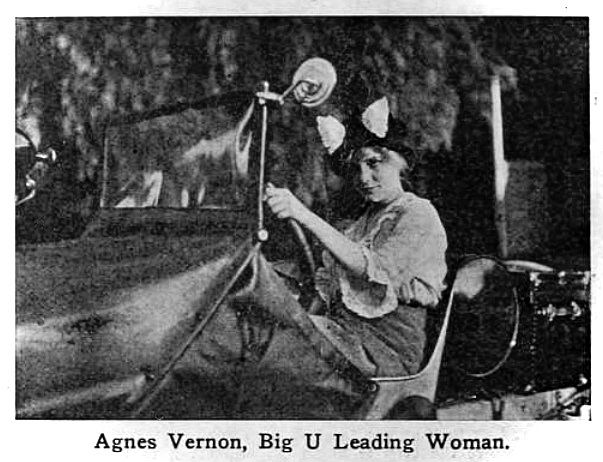
Brownie sitting in Abe's marriage gift

- January 9, 1915—First Love Says "Yes" - Abe Deuce Announces Engagement

"Mr. Abe Deuce announced today that, just after he had given up all hope, he had received his answer from Miss Agnes Vernon of Universal Company, and that it had been— yes." After her acceptance, Deuce roused his jeweler out of bed and purchased a diamond ring. On January 18, The Seattle Times claims it was love at first sight and now they will marry.

By the last week in January 1915, the official engagement announcement appeared in national newspapers and trade publications. In the next couple of months, Deuce not only gives Vernon a diamond ring, but he also buys her a roadster since the teenager does not have a car. It is during this time, Deuce informed Vernon - they can only have one breadwinner in the family. After marriage, the couple will move to the big city where he will work for a major newspaper. On the other hand, she will have to abandon her movie career and become a housewife while they raise a family.

- April 1915 — The first announcements of the broken engagement started to appear in the media.

When Deuce told Vernon she would have to choose between career or domesticity, Vernon's choice became simple. One news item appearing through the US contains the quote - "I got married to make my future", said 29-year-old actress Pauline Bush with a happy smile. "And I didn't get married so that I could make mine", answered Agnes Vernon.

=== John K. Wells ===
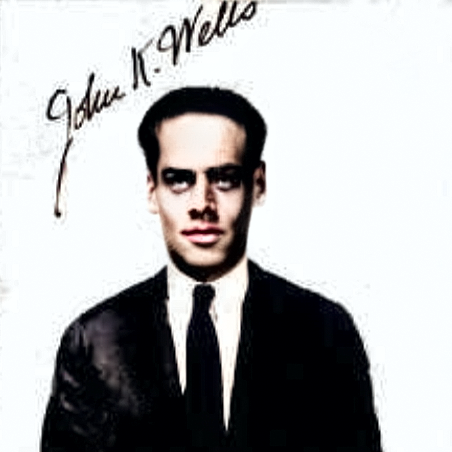
1919 John K. Wells

A news article in Billboard, dated November 19, 1921, stated John K. Wells was already married to Brownie Vernon.

Wells also followed in his father's footsteps. In January 1925, the "California Directory of Brokers and Salesmen" posted John K. Wells establishing a corporation — Lathrop-Wells Inc. They become a real estate brokerage firm headquartered in La Jolla, California with the following officials:

• J.M. Lathrop	President
• John K. Wells	Vice President
• Judith A. Vernon	Secretary

The 1930 and 1940 Censuses also verify the marriage. (Note: 1940 Census housewife - The 1940 Census shows John and Judith Wells living together as a married couple in San Diego, California. It no longer indicates Judith as secretary of an Insurance firm but records her occupation as a full-time housewife. The census also reveals a full-time live-in nurse at the residence.) John Wells was married to Judith Vernon Wells née Agnes Vernon for 27 years. There were no children.

== Death ==
Judith Vernon Wells (Agnes Vernon) died of heart complications on Saturday, February 21, 1948, in La Jolla, California, (San Diego), California. She was 52 years old. (Note: Name changes - Agnes Vernon went through several name changes during her life. She was born Agnes Vernon. In 1917, she changed her name to "Brownie" Vernon (based on her big brown eyes and choice of brown clothing). In the early 20s, her name changed to — Judith Vernon Wells.) She was entombed in the Greenwood Memorial Park Mausoleum in San Diego, California. Her occupation is recorded on the death certificate as – a housewife. (Note: Death certificate - Judith Vernon Wells aka Mrs. Agnes Vernon death certificate is available for purchase from the San Diego Assessor/Recorder/County Clerk Certificate of Death 48-0157; Judith Vernon Wells Died: February 21, 1948, 01:00 am; Born La Grande, Oregon December 27, 1895, Age – 52 yrs old; Father – Ross Vernon, Missouri; Mother – Louise Warmouth Missouri Occupation – Housewife Informant John K. Wells, 520 East Roosevelt, Phoenix, AZ Death Certificate signed February 24, 1948, Death caused by chronic myocarditis)

Judith Vernon Wells's obituary reads:
"Last rites for Mrs. Judith Vernon Wells, who died Saturday in the home of her parents, Mr. and Mrs. Charles N. Noah .... Mrs. Wells and her husband, John K. Wells, resided in Phoenix for four years. She recently became ill and moved to La Jolla to be with her parents. She was a native of Oregon." There is no mention of an acting career. Her mausoleum plaque reads: Judith Vernon Wells 1895 - 1948.

On Sunday, December 27, 1953, her husband, John K. Wells, died of a heart attack in Glendale, California. He was 67 years old. Wells had formerly been in charge of publications for the Church of Christ, Scientists in Arizona and currently worked as a sales representative for the Arizona radio station KTAR. There was no mention of any Hollywood connections in his obituary.

== Myths ==
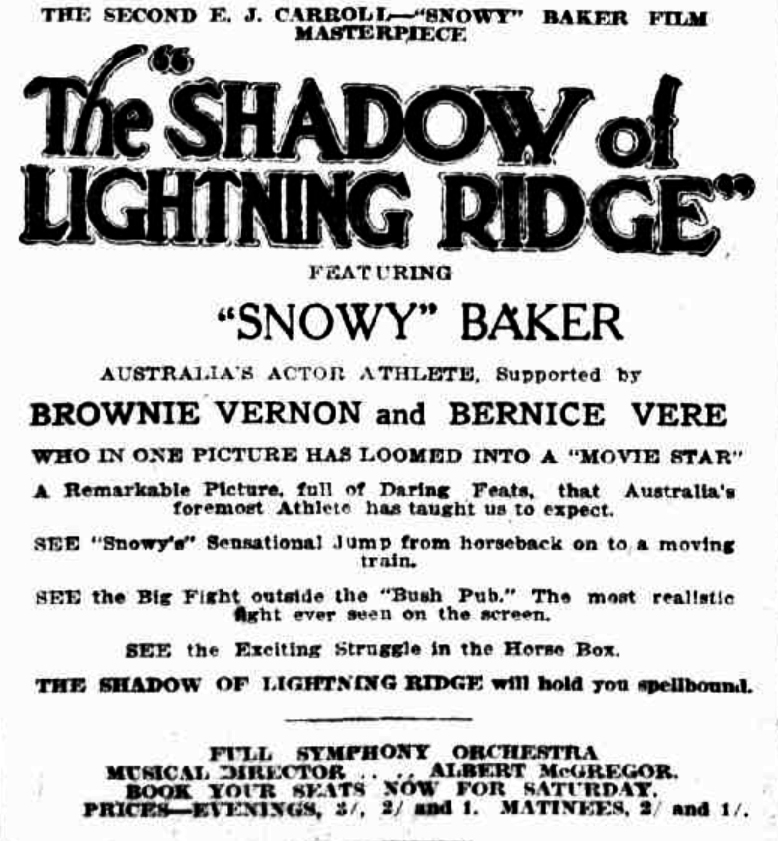
Australian Movie Ad

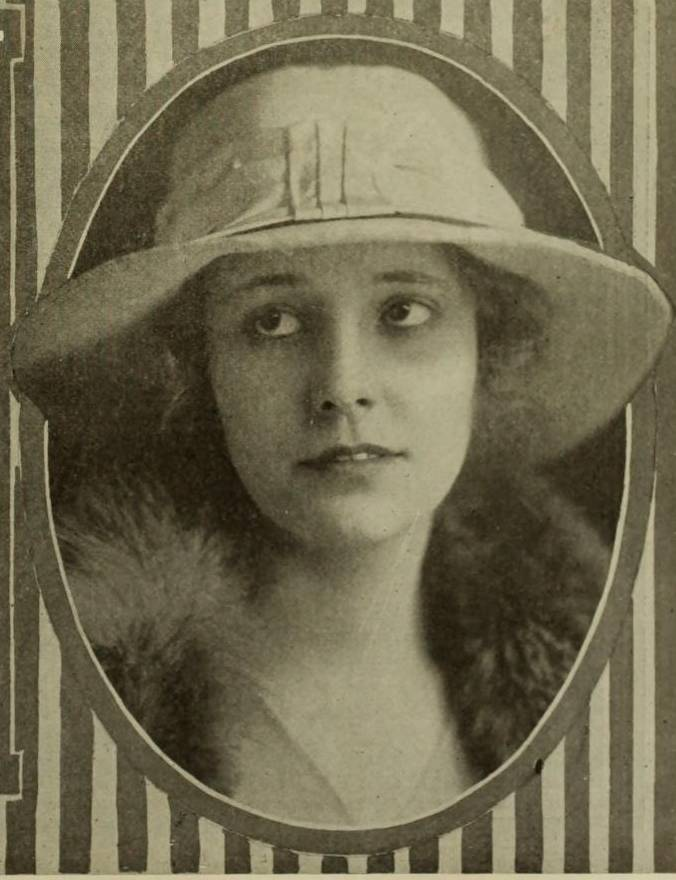
Brownie
Vernon

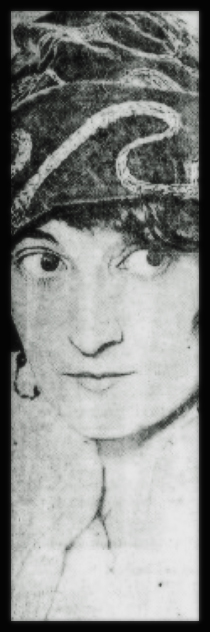
Bernice
Vere

Some reviewers have inferred Agnes "Brownie" Vernon changed her stage name to "Bernice Vere" to continue acting in Australian pictures. Many of Bernice Vere's movie credits were changed to Brownie Vernon in various movie databases.

Agnes "Brownie" Vernon acted in 3 Australian movies. The trio of films was released between 1920 and 1921:

- The Man from Kangaroo - produced by the Baker-Meredyth-Lucas consortium, was released on January 24, 1920. Brownie Vernon played Muriel Hammond.
- The Shadow of Lightning Ridge - produced by Baker-Meredyth-Lucas - was released on April 3, 1920. Brownie Vernon played "Dorothy Harden," and Bernice Vere played "Portuguese Annie," After completing The Shadow of Lightning Ridge, Agnes Vernon left Australia and headed back to California in May 1920.
- Silks and Saddles - produced by Commonwealth Pictures, directed by Brownie's husband John K. Wells, and released on March 5, 1921. Brownie Vernon played Bobbie Morton. Vernon had returned to Australia to make this film and spent the remainder of 1921 in Australia while her husband pursued business opportunities. Vernon's time in Australia during 1921 is the primary source of the Agnes Vernon/Bernice Vere controversy. Brownie and her husband sailed for California in March 1922.

Bernice Vere made four movies in Australia before heading to Hollywood in November 1921.

- The Shadow of Lightning Ridge was released on April 3, 1920. The newspaper ads credit both Brownie Vernon and Bernice Vere. All newspaper ads for the movie, giving credit to both actresses, should have ended this controversy.
- The Jackeroo of Coolabong was the last movie produced by the Baker-Meredyth-Lucas consortium, released on October 16, 1920. The Fighting Breed is the repackaged version of this movie made for US audiences and released on September 1, 1921. IMDb listing for The Jackeroo of Coolabong credits Bernice Vere as "the Moll." The American Film Institute gives no credit to Bernice Vere but lists Agnes Vernon in the cast. The AFI site also displays this qualifier "Various sources have expressed doubt that Brownie Vernon appeared in the film." The IMDb listing for The Fighting Breed mentioned neither actress. Bernice did receive a review in the Australian media for her performance in this film.
- The Betrayer was released on March 19, 1921, and directed by Beaumont Smith. Bernice Vere played Eleanor Barris. IMDbcredits Agnes Vernon playing Eleanor Barris. The Australian media notes - In March–April timeframe of 1921, Beaumont Smith took "from Sydney, a company of 12 actors and actresses, cameramen, and a full technical staff to New Zealand." The article also published a list of the actors, which included Bernice Vere, and emphasized that Beaumont Smith only used Australian actors for this film.
- The Blue Mountains Mystery was released on November 5, 1921. Bernice Vere played Pauline Tracey. Silent Era credits "Bernice Vere (Agnes Vernon)" as playing the part of Pauline Tracey. IMDb credits "Agnes Vernon as Pauline Tracey". The Australian media provided two reviews for Bernice Vere as shown above validating her part in the movie. In May 1922, the film was released in the US after changing the title to The Blue Mountain Mystery. According to an advertisement in the Motion Picture News, the movie featured John Faulkner and Bernice Ware. The AFI record of the film shows Bernice Ware playing Pauline Tracey.

== Filmography ==
This list is the filmography of Agnes (Brownie) Vernon. Vernon first appeared on the silver screen as an uncredited extra in March 1913. Her uncredited appearances are not chronicled in this filmography. All appearances in Universal short films were verified using The Braff silent short film working papers (1903-1929), The Universal Silents (1912-1929), American Film Personnel and Company Credits, 1908 - 1920 and the Internet Archive. All Universal feature products and non-Universal films are verified using the American Film Institute website or Internet Archive.

◆ Filmography of Agnes Vernon ◆
Year	Title	Production	Distribution	Genre	Length	Released	Lead	Dir
1914 (16 films)	The Triumph of Mind	Bison	Universal	Drama	short	1914-05-23	Lois Weber	Lois Weber
1914 (16 films)	Avenged	Rex	Universal	Drama	short	1914-05-24	Lois Weber	Lois Weber
1914 (16 films)	The Old Cobbler	Bison	Universal	Western	short	1914-06-27	MacQuarrie	MacQuarrie
1914 (16 films)	A Ranch Romance	Nestor	Universal	Western	short	1914-07-08	MacQuarrie	unknown
1914 (16 films)	Her Grave Mistake	Nestor	Universal	Drama	short	1914-07-15	MacQuarrie	MacQuarrie
1914 (16 films)	By the Sun's Rays	Nestor	Universal	Western	short	1914-07-22	MacQuarrie	Giblyn
1914 (16 films)	An Awkward Cinderella	Rex	Universal	Comedy	short	1914-07-26	Leonard	Turner
1914 (16 films)	The Oubliette	Bison	Universal	Drama	short	1914-08-15	MacQuarrie	Giblyn
1914 (16 films)	A Miner's Romance	Nestor	Universal	Western	short	1914-08-26	MacQuarrie	MacQuarrie
1914 (16 films)	The Old Bell Ringer	Nestor	Universal	Drama	short	1914-10-07	MacQuarrie	MacQuarrie
1914 (16 films)	A Law Unto Herself	Rex	Universal	Drama	short	1914-10-08	Julian	Grasse
1914 (16 films)	The Wall of Flame	Nestor	Universal	Western	short	1914-10-27	MacQuarrie	MacQuarrie
1914 (16 films)	The Star Gazer	Nestor	Universal	Drama	short	1914-11-03	MacQuarrie	MacQuarrie
1914 (16 films)	Ninety Black Boxes	Bison	Universal	Drama	short	1914-11-21	MacQuarrie	Giblyn
1914 (16 films)	For I Have Toiled	Rex	Universal	Drama	short	1914-12-22	MacQuarrie	MacQuarrie
1914 (16 films)	When It's One of Your Own	Nestor	Universal	Drama	short	1914-12-29	MacQuarrie	MacQuarrie
1915 (35 films)	His Last Performance	Universal	Universal	Drama	short	1915-01-15	MacQuarrie	MacQuarrie
1915 (35 films)	The Dear Old Hypocrite	Universal	Universal	Drama	short	1915-01-19	MacQuarrie	MacQuarrie
1915 (35 films)	Alias Mr. Smith	Universal	Universal	Drama	short	1915-01-26	MacQuarrie	MacQuarrie
1915 (35 films)	Seven and Seventy	Universal	Universal	Drama	short	1915-02-02	MacQuarrie	MacQuarrie
1915 (35 films)	Dad	Universal	Universal	Comedy	short	1915-02-09	MacQuarrie	unknown
1915 (35 films)	An Example	Universal	Universal	Drama	short	1915-02-18	MacQuarrie	Giblyn
1915 (35 films)	A Prayer of a Horse or: His Life Story Told by Himself	Universal	Universal	Drama	short	1915-02-25	MacQuarrie	MacQuarrie
1915 (35 films)	Wheels within Wheels	Universal	Universal	Drama	short	1915-03-02	MacQuarrie	MacQuarrie
1915 (35 films)	The Truth About Dan Deering	Universal	Universal	Drama	short	1915-03-11	MacQuarrie	MacQuarrie
1915 (35 films)	At His Own Terms	Universal	Universal	Drama	short	1915-03-16	MacQuarrie	Giblyn
1915 (35 films)	No. 239	Universal	Universal	Drama	short	1915-03-25	MacQuarrie	Giblyn
1915 (35 films)	The Cameo Ring	Universal	Universal	Drama	short	1915-04-01	MacQuarrie	Giblyn
1915 (35 films)	Putting One Over	Universal	Universal	Drama	short	1915-04-06	MacQuarrie	Giblyn
1915 (35 films)	The Old Tutor	Universal	Universal	Drama	short	1915-04-13	MacQuarrie	MacQuarrie
1915 (35 films)	The Troubadour	Universal	Universal	Drama	short	1915-04-15	MacQuarrie	MacQuarrie
1915 (35 films)	The Fear Within	Universal	Universal	Drama	short	1915-04-22	MacQuarrie	Giblyn
1915 (35 films)	Where Brains are Needed	Universal	Universal	Drama	short	1915-05-16	MacQuarrie	MacQuarrie
1915 (35 films)	The Dancer	Universal	Universal	Drama	short	1915-05-18	Giblyn	Giblyn
1915 (35 films)	When Love is Love	Universal	Universal	Drama	short	1915-05-22	Bush	Grasse
1915 (35 films)	The Old Doctor	Universal	Universal	Drama	short	1915-05-23	MacQuarrie	MacQuarrie
1915 (35 films)	The Heart of Cerise	Universal	Universal	Drama	short	1915-06-03	Bush	Grasse
1915 (35 films)	In His Mind's Eye	Universal	Universal	Drama	short	1915-06-10	MacQuarrie	Giblyn
1915 (35 films)	The Tinker of Stubbenville	Universal	Universal	Drama	short	1915-06-24	MacQuarrie	MacQuarrie
1915 (35 films)	Jane's Declaration of Independence	Bison	Universal	Drama	short	1915-07-03	Henley	Giblyn
1915 (35 films)	The People of the Pit	Universal	Universal	Drama	short	1915-07-13	Cleo Madison	Giblyn
1915 (35 films)	The Flight of a Night Bird	Universal	Universal	Drama	short	1915-07-27	Henley	Giblyn
1915 (35 films)	Misjudged	Universal	Universal	Drama	short	1915-08-31	Rawlinson	Worthington
1915 (35 films)	The Deceivers	Universal	Universal	Drama	short	1915-09-07	Vernon	Giblyn
1915 (35 films)	Agnes Kempler's Sacrifice	Rex	Universal	Drama	short	1915-09-12	Henley	Henley
1915 (35 films)	Her Three Mothers	Universal	Universal	Drama	short	1915-10-02	Vernon	Giblyn
1915 (35 films)	The Silent Battle	Universal	Universal	Drama	short	1915-10-05	Henley	Mothe
1915 (35 films)	The Girl of the Dance Hall	Universal	Universal	Drama	short	1915-10-14	Vernon	Mothe
1915 (35 films)	The Phatom Fortune	Universal	Universal	Drama	short	1915-11-22	Henley	Otto
1915 (35 films)	In Search of a Wife	Universal	Universal	Drama	short	1915-11-23	Rawlinson	Worthington
1915 (35 films)	As the Shadows Fall	Universal	Universal	Drama	short	1915-12-28	Rawlinson	Worthington
1916 (23 films)	The Family Secret	Universal	Universal	Drama	short	1916-02-15	Rawlinson	Worthington
1916 (23 films)	The Dupe	Universal	Universal	Drama	short	1916-02-22	Rawlinson	Worthington
1916 (23 films)	Tangled Hearts	Universal	Universal	Drama	short	1916-04-02	Grasse	Grasse
1916 (23 films)	Public Approval	Universal	Universal	Drama	short	1916-04-13	Ray Hanford	Mothe
1916 (23 films)	The Mark of a Gentleman	Universal	Universal	Drama	short	1916-05-09	Rawlinson	Worthington
1916 (23 films)	Darcy of the Northwest Mounted	Universal	Universal	Drama	short	1916-05-16	Rawlinson	Worthington
1916 (23 films)	The Wire Pullers	Universal	Universal	Comedy	short	1916-06-04	Rawlinson	Worthington
1916 (23 films)	The Rose Colored Scarf	Universal	Universal	Drama	short	1916-06-06	Rawlinson	Worthington
1916 (23 films)	The False Part	Universal	Universal	Drama	short	1916-06-20	Rawlinson	Worthington
1916 (23 films)	They Wouldn't Take Him Seriously	Universal	Universal	Drama	short	1916-07-04	Rawlinson	Worthington
1916 (23 films)	A Dead Yesterday	Rex	Universal	Drama	short	1916-07-09	Henley	Giblyn
1916 (23 films)	Nature Incorporated	Universal	Universal	Drama	short	1916-07-11	Rawlinson	Worthington
1916 (23 films)	Lee Blount Goes Home	IMP	Universal	Drama	short	1916-07-21	Rawlinson	Worthington
1916 (23 films)	Won by Valor	IMP	Universal	Drama	short	1916-07-27	Crampton	Hill
1916 (23 films)	A Daughter of the Night	IMP	Universal	Drama	short	1916-08-04	Lowery	Powers
1916 (23 films)	The Toll of the Law	IMP	Universal	Drama	short	1916-08-16	Lowery	Powers
1916 (23 films)	The Call of the Past	IMP	Universal	Drama	short	1916-09-01	Lowery	Lowery
1916 (23 films)	Main 4400	Victor Film	Universal	Comedy	short	1916-10-22	Rawlinson	Worthington
1916 (23 films)	Stumbling	IMP	Universal	Drama	short	1916-11-03	Livingston	Mothe
1916 (23 films)	The Eyes of Love	Rex	Universal	Drama	short	1916-11-10	Mulhall	Kelsey
1916 (23 films)	A Stranger from Somewhere	Universal	Universal	Drama	Feature	1916-11-13	Farnum	Worthington
1916 (23 films)	Little Partner	Universal	Universal	Drama	short	1916-12-19	Farnum	Worthington
1916 (23 films)	The Prodigal Daughter	Rex	Universal	Drama	short	1916-12-31	Holubar	Holubar
1917 (13 films)	How to Be Happy Though Married	Victor Film	Universal	Comedy	short	1917-01-06	Vernon	Kelsey
1917 (13 films)	A Slave of Fear	IMP	Universal	Drama	short	1917-01-17	Wilson	Kelsey
1917 (13 films)	The Man Who Took a Chance	Universal	Universal	Comedy	Feature	1917-02-19	Farnum	Worthington
1917 (13 films)	The Clock	Universal	Universal	Comedy	Feature	1917-04-30	Farnum	Worthington
1917 (13 films)	Bringing Home Father	Universal	Universal	Comedy	Feature	1917-06-04	Farnum	Worthington
1917 (13 films)	Dangers of a Bride	Keystone	Triangle	Comedy	short	1917-07-08	Swanson	Kerr&Hoffman
1917 (13 films)	The Car of Chance	Universal	Universal	Drama	Feature	1917-07-09	Farnum	Worthington
1917 (13 films)	Hatton of Headquarters	IMP	Universal	Drama	short	1917-07-15	Hill	Worthington
1917 (13 films)	The Clean-Up	Universal	Universal	Comedy	Feature	1917-08-06	Farnum	Worthington
1917 (13 films)	A Stormy Knight	Universal	Universal	Comedy	Feature	1917-09-10	Farnum	Clifton
1917 (13 films)	Flirting with Death	Universal	Universal	Drama	Feature	1917-09-18	Rawlinson	Clifton
1917 (13 films)	Fear Not	Universal	Universal	Drama	Feature	1917-11-26	Rawlinson	Holubar
1917 (13 films)	The High Sign	Universal	Universal	Drama	Feature	1917-12-31	Rawlinson	Clifton
1919	The Coming of the Law	Fox Film	Fox Film	Western	Feature	1919-05-11	Tom Mix	Rosson
1919	Bare-Fisted Gallagher	Hampton Prod	Robertson-Cole	Western	Feature	1919-06-22	Desmond	Franz
1919	Widow by Proxy	Paramount	Paramount	Comedy	Feature	1919-08-28	Clark	Edwards
1920	The Man from Kangaroo	Carroll-Baker	Carroll-Baker	Drama	Feature	1920-01-24	Baker	Lucas
1921	The Better Man (1)	Selig-Rork	Aywon	Drama	Feature	1921-11-26	Baker	Lucas
1921	The Shadow of Lightning Ridge	Carroll-Baker	Carroll-Baker	Drama	Feature	1921-04-03	Baker	Lucas
1921	The Shadow of Lightning Ridge (2)	Selig-Rork	Aywon	Drama	Feature	1921-09-13	Baker	Lucas
1921	Silks and Saddles	Commonwealth	Commonwealth	Drama	Feature	1921-05-05	R MacKinnon	Wells
1922	The Queen of the Turf (3)	FBO	FBO	Drama	Feature	1922-04-16	R MacKinnon	Wells
Denote film with Universal Bluebird designation Denote film with Universal Butterfly designation (1) The Better Man is the repackaged version of The Man from Kangaroo made for US audiences. (2) The Shadow of Lightning Ridge was repackaged for US audiences on this date. (3) The Queen of the Turf is the recut version of Silks and Saddles made for US audiences.

== See also ==
- List of rediscovered films

== Bibliography ==
- Braff, Richard E. (1999). The Universal Silents 1912-1929. Jefferson, North Carolina: McFarland & Company, Inc. p. 675. ISBN 0-7864-0287-3. "A filmography of the Universal Picture Manufacturing Company, 1912-1929"
- Braff, Richard E (2002). The Braff silent short film working papers. Jefferson, NC: McFarland & Co. p. 696. ISBN 0-7864-1031-0. "over 25,000 films, 1903-1929, alphabetized and indexed"
- Codori, J. (2020). Film History Through Trade Journal Art, 1916-1920. McFarland, Incorporated, Publishers. ISBN 978-1-4766-3829-4.
- Cooper, M.G. (2010). Universal Women: Filmmaking and Institutional Change in Early Hollywood. Women and film history international. University of Illinois Press. ISBN 978-0-252-03522-7.
- Edmunds, I. G. (1977). BIG U - Universal in the Silent Days. Cranbury, New Jersey: A.S.Barnes and Co, Inc. p. 162. ISBN 0-498-01809-1.
- Hirschhorn, Clive (1983). The Universal Story (1st ed.). New York: Crown Publishers. p. 400. ISBN 0-517-55001-6. "The Complete History of the Studio and its 2,641 Films"
- Mahar, K.W. (2008). Women Filmmakers in Early Hollywood. Studies in Industry and Society. Johns Hopkins University Press. ISBN 978-0-8018-9084-0.
- Spehr, Paul E.; Lundquist, Gunnar (1996). American Film Personnel and Company Credits, 1908 - 1920. Jefferson, North Carolina: McFarland & Company, Inc. p. 695. ISBN 0-7864-0255-5.
- Stamp, S. (2015). Lois Weber in Early Hollywood. EBL-Schweitzer. University of California Press. ISBN 978-0-520-24152-7.
