= The Man Who Took a Chance =

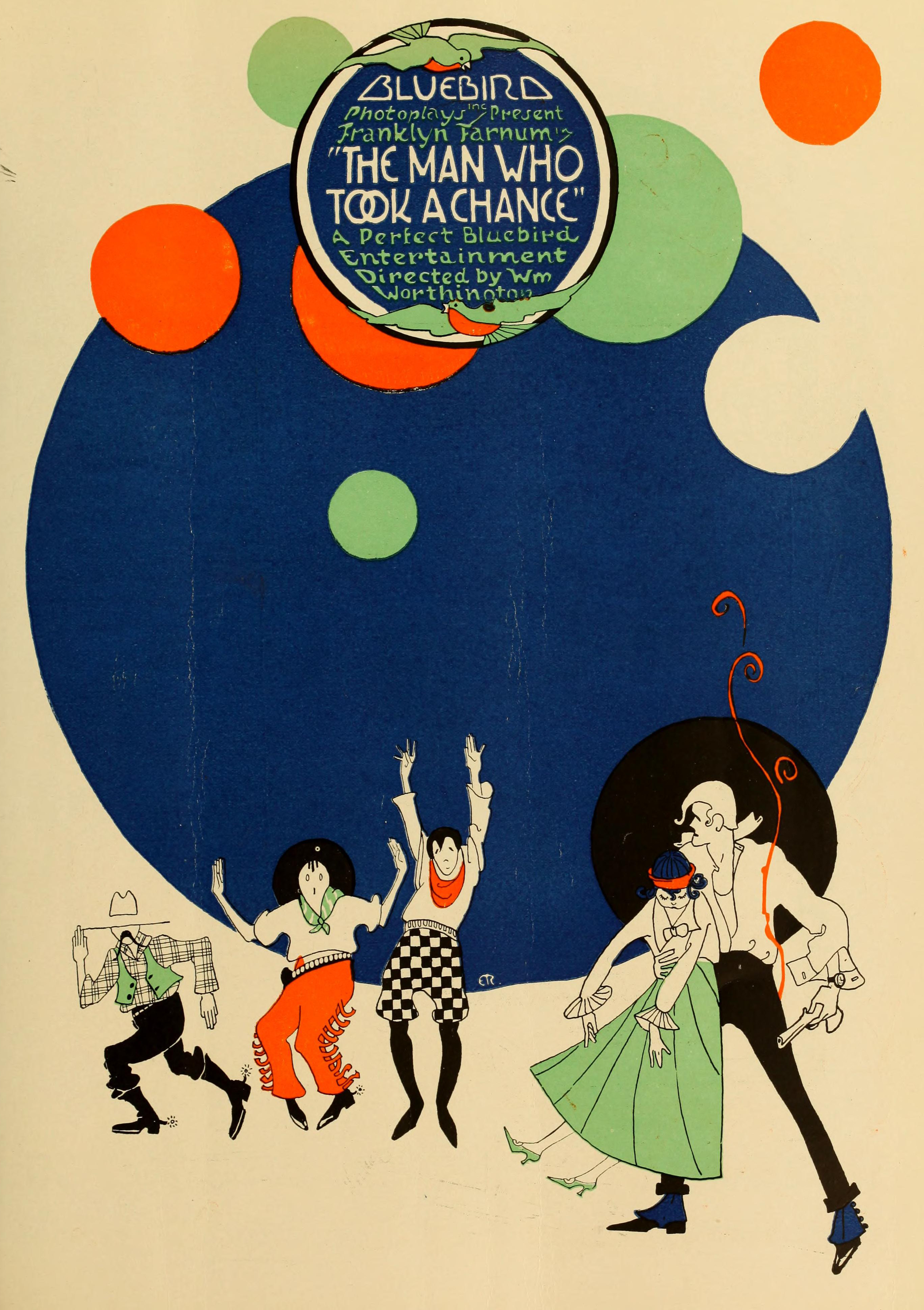
- Directed by: William Worthington
- Written by: Bennett Cohen
- Starring: Franklyn Farnum; Agnes Vernon; Lloyd Whitlock
- Cinematography: Friend Baker
- Production company: Universal Pictures
- Distributed by: Universal Pictures
- Release date: February 19, 1917
- Running time: 50 minutes
- Country: United States
- Languages: Silent; English intertitles

The Man Who Took a Chance is a 1917 American silent comedy drama film directed by William Worthington and starring Franklyn Farnum, Agnes Vernon and Lloyd Whitlock.

== Cast ==
- Franklyn Farnum as Monty Gray
- Agnes Vernon as Constance Lanning
- Lloyd Whitlock as Wilbur Mason
- Countess Du Cello as Mrs. Lanning
- Mark Fenton as Richard Lanning
- Charles Perley as The Duke of Canister
- Arthur Hoyt as James

== Bibliography ==
- George A. Katchmer. Eighty Silent Film Stars: Biographies and Filmographies of the Obscure to the Well Known. McFarland, 1991.
