= A Ranch Romance =

1914 film

- Directed by: Unknown
- Written by: Seymour Hastings
- Produced by: Nestor Film Co.
- Starring: Murdock MacQuarrie; Lon Chaney
- Distributed by: Universal Pictures
- Release date: July 8, 1914
- Running time: 20 minutes
- Country: United States
- Languages: Silent; English intertitles

A Ranch Romance is a 1914 American silent Western film featuring Murdock MacQuarrie and Lon Chaney. A still from the film exists showing Chaney in action. The film is now considered to be lost.

== Plot ==
John Preston, a ranch owner, owes a fortune to Don Jose Praz. The Don's son, Raphael Praz, steals some of Preston's cattle with the aid of an accomplice. Raphael loves John Preston's daughter Kate and urges his father to win Preston's consent to their marriage. Kate however is in love with the ranch's foreman, Jack Deering, and her father refuses to intervene.

Desperate, Raphael kidnaps the girl and brings her to a lonely cabin in the woods. Kate fights him, but her strength is no match for the villain. Meanwhile, the girl's horse has returned home to the ranch by itself. Jack, accompanied by the other cowboys, trails Raphael to the cabin and kills him in a death duel.

== Cast ==
- Murdock MacQuarrie as Jack Deering
- Agnes Vernon as Kate Preston
- Lon Chaney as Raphael Praz
- Seymour Hastings as John Preston
- Edgar Keller as Don Jose Praz

== Reception ==
Moving Picture World wrote: "The scenic effects are good and the situations, while very familiar, have a little more dash and go to them than usual." Motion Picture News wrote: "The plot is conventional but is enacted in a manner that makes it most interesting. There is an excellent fight scene between the two men."
