= The High Sign (1917 film) =

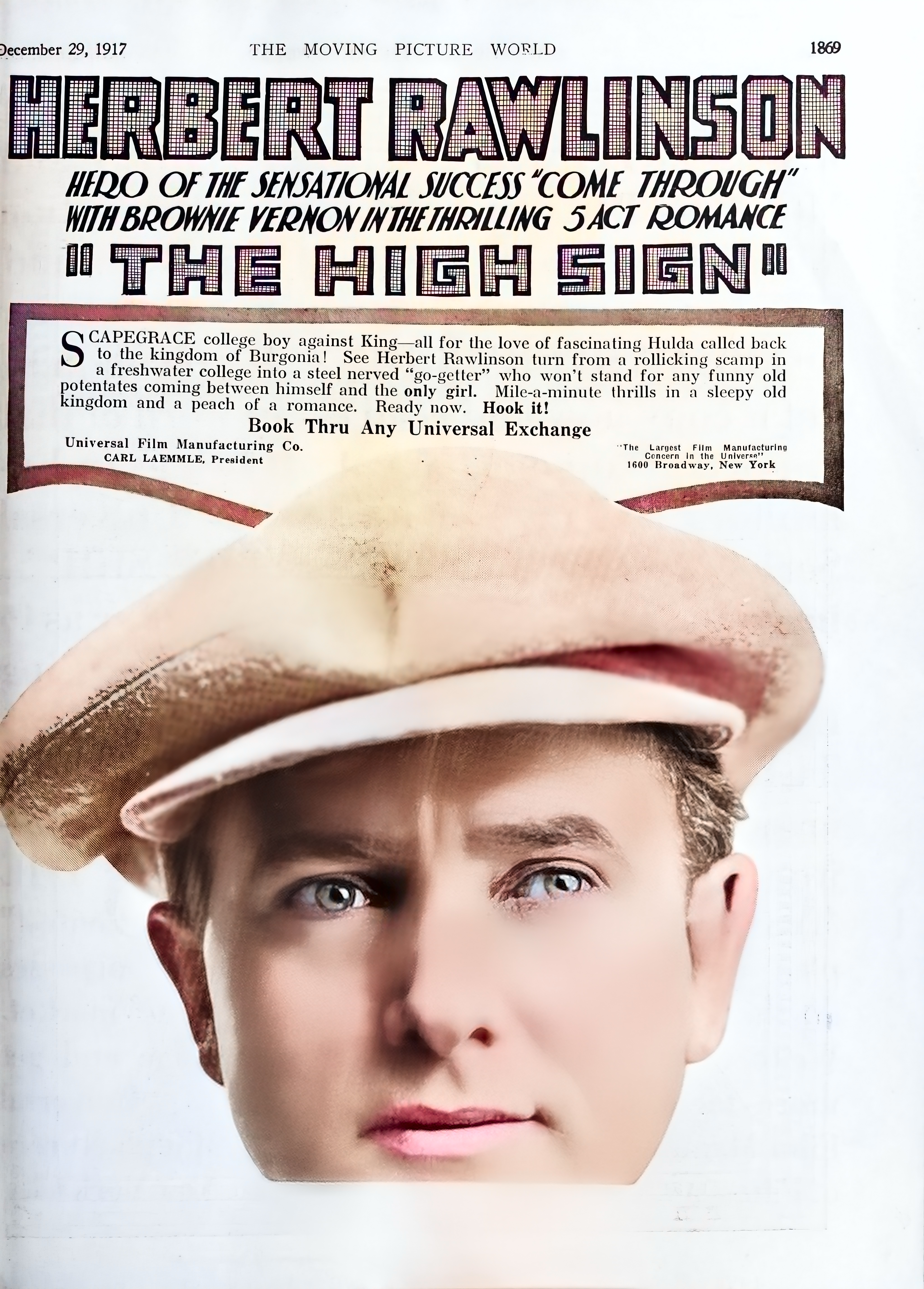
- AI upscaled and colorized version of a 1917 Moving Picture World Movie ad
- Directed by: Elmer Clifton
- Written by: Waldemar Young; J. Grubb Alexander
- Produced by: Herbert Rawlinson
- Starring: Herbert Rawlinson; Agnes Vernon; Hayward Mack
- Production company: Universal Pictures
- Distributed by: Universal Pictures
- Release date: December 16, 1917
- Running time: 50 minutes
- Country: United States
- Languages: Silent; English intertitles

The High Sign is a 1917 American silent drama film directed by Elmer Clifton and starring Herbert Rawlinson, Agnes Vernon and Hayward Mack.

== Cast ==
- Herbert Rawlinson as Donald Bruce
- Agnes Vernon as Hulda Maroff
- Hayward Mack as Prince Arnoff
- Nellie Allen as Vonia Grayley
- Ed Brady as Hugo Mackensen
- Mark Fenton as Ivan Posloff
- Frank MacQuarrie as Metwer
- Albert MacQuarrie as Nickelob

== Bibliography ==
- James Robert Parish & Michael R. Pitts. Film directors: a guide to their American films. Scarecrow Press, 1974.
