= A Stormy Knight =

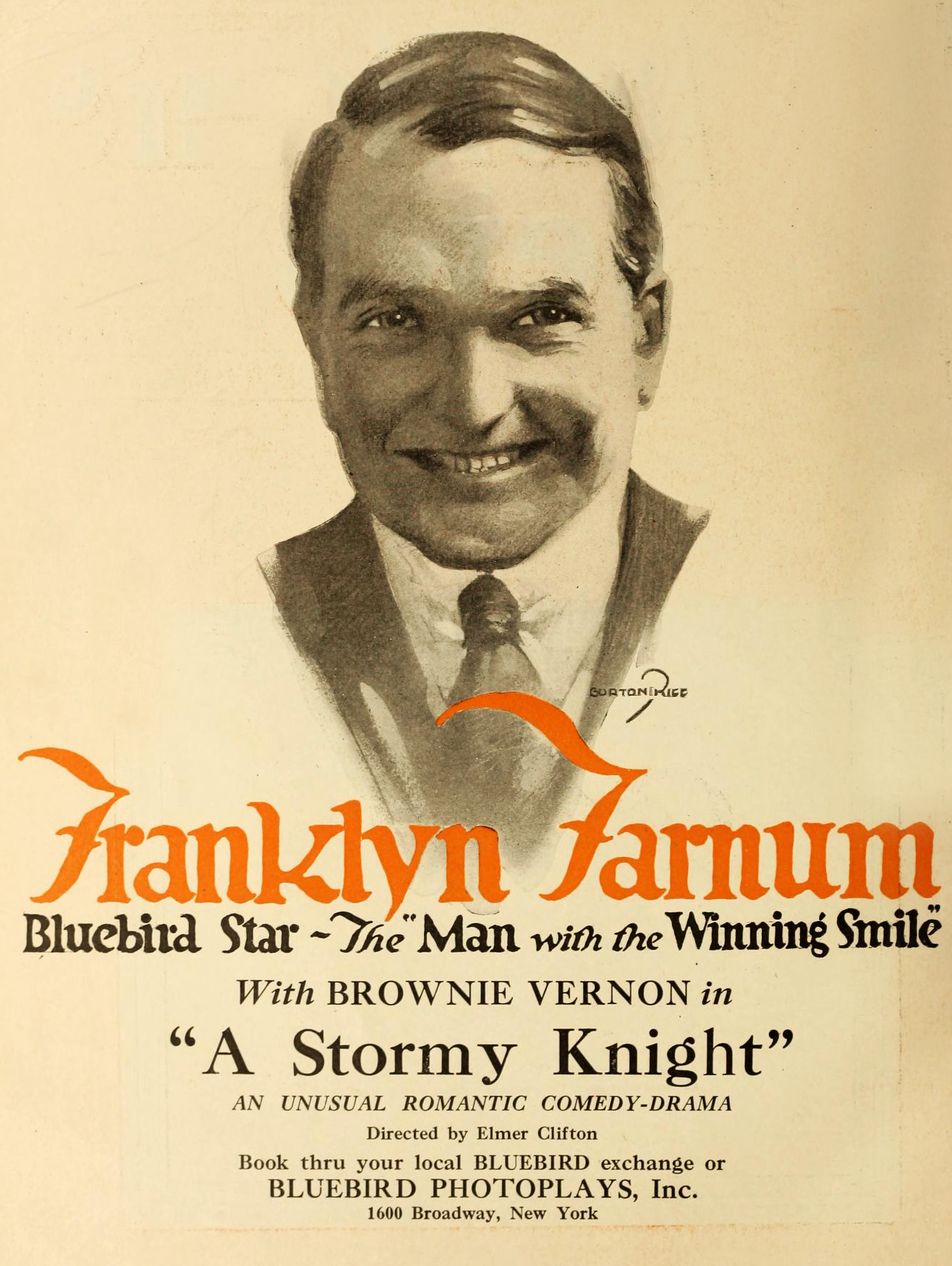
- Directed by: Elmer Clifton
- Written by: Jack Cunningham; Waldemar Young
- Starring: Franklyn Farnum; Jean Hersholt; Agnes Vernon
- Cinematography: Virgil Miller
- Production company: Universal Pictures
- Distributed by: Universal Pictures
- Release date: 1917
- Running time: 50 minutes
- Country: United States
- Languages: Silent; English intertitles

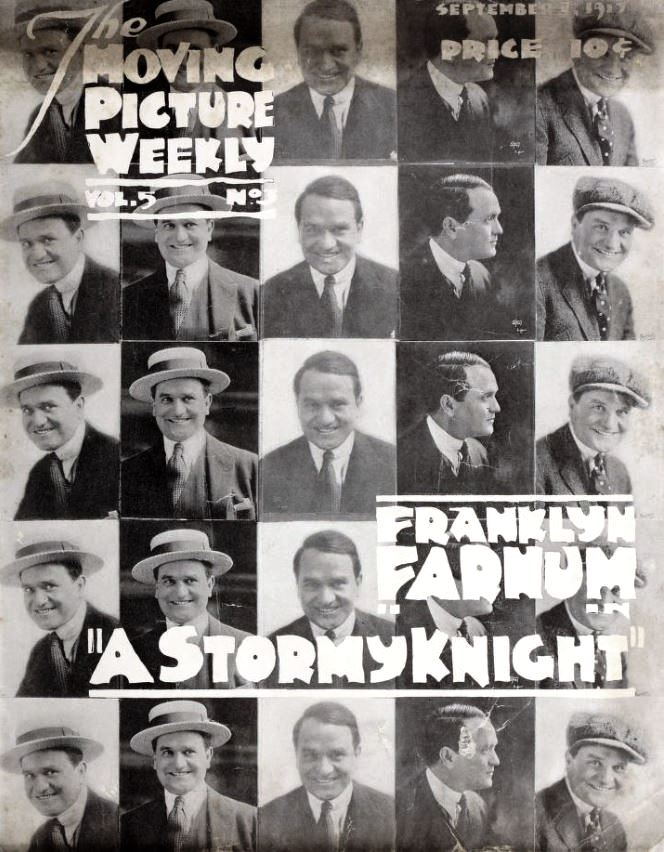
A Stormy Knight ad in Motion Picture News of 1917

A Stormy Knight is a 1917 American silent comedy mystery film directed by Elmer Clifton and starring Franklyn Farnum, Jean Hersholt and Agnes Vernon.

== Cast ==
- Franklyn Farnum as John Winton
- Jean Hersholt as Dr. Fraser
- Agnes Vernon as Mary Weller
- Hayward Mack as Richard Weller
- Frank MacQuarrie as Mr. Weller

== Bibliography ==
- Robert B. Connelly. The Silents: Silent Feature Films, 1910-36, Volume 40, Issue 2. December Press, 1998.
