= Bringing Home Father =

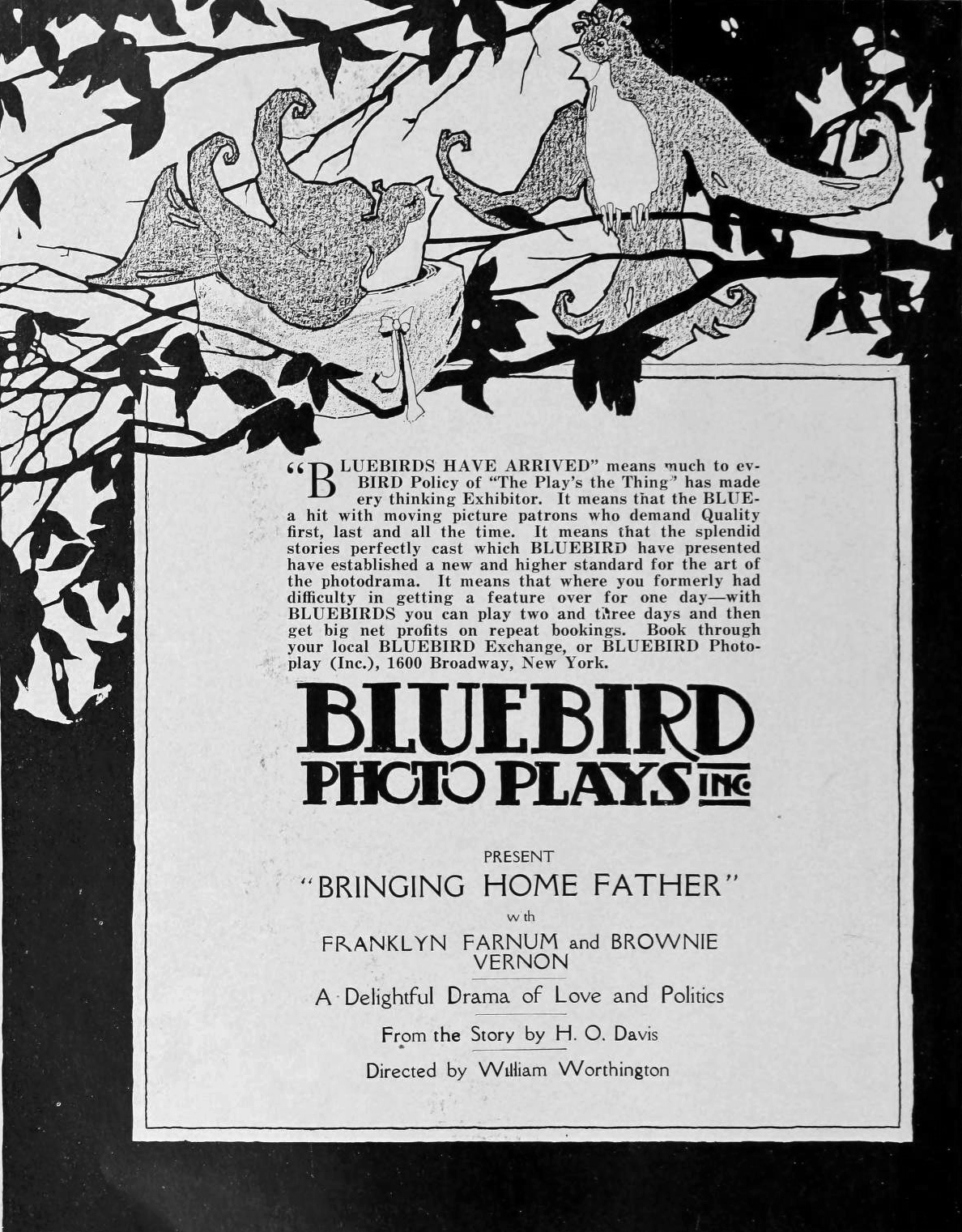
- Ad from The Moving Picture Weekly
- Directed by: William Worthington
- Written by: H.O. Davis; Bess Meredyth
- Produced by: The producer of the classic comic strip "Bringing Up Father" was George McManus, who also served as its creator. This iconic comic strip, which debuted in 1913, humorously depicted the lives of Jiggs, an Irish-American immigrant, and his wife, Maggie, as they navigated their rise to wealth and social standing
- Starring: Franklyn Farnum; Agnes Vernon; Florence Mayon
- Production company: Universal Pictures
- Distributed by: Universal Pictures
- Release date: June 4, 1917
- Running time: 50 minutes
- Country: United States
- Languages: Silent; English intertitles

Bringing Home Father is a 1917 American silent comedy film directed by William Worthington and starring Franklyn Farnum, Agnes Vernon and Florence Mayon.

== Cast ==
- Franklyn Farnum as Peter Drake
- Agnes Vernon as Jackie Swazey
- Florence Mayon as Eliza Tilly Swazey
- Arthur Hoyt as Pa Swazey
- Dick La Reno as Mike Clancey

== Bibliography ==
- Robert B. Connelly. The Silents: Silent Feature Films, 1910-36, Volume 40, Issue 2. December Press, 1998.
