= The Coming of the Law =

1919 film

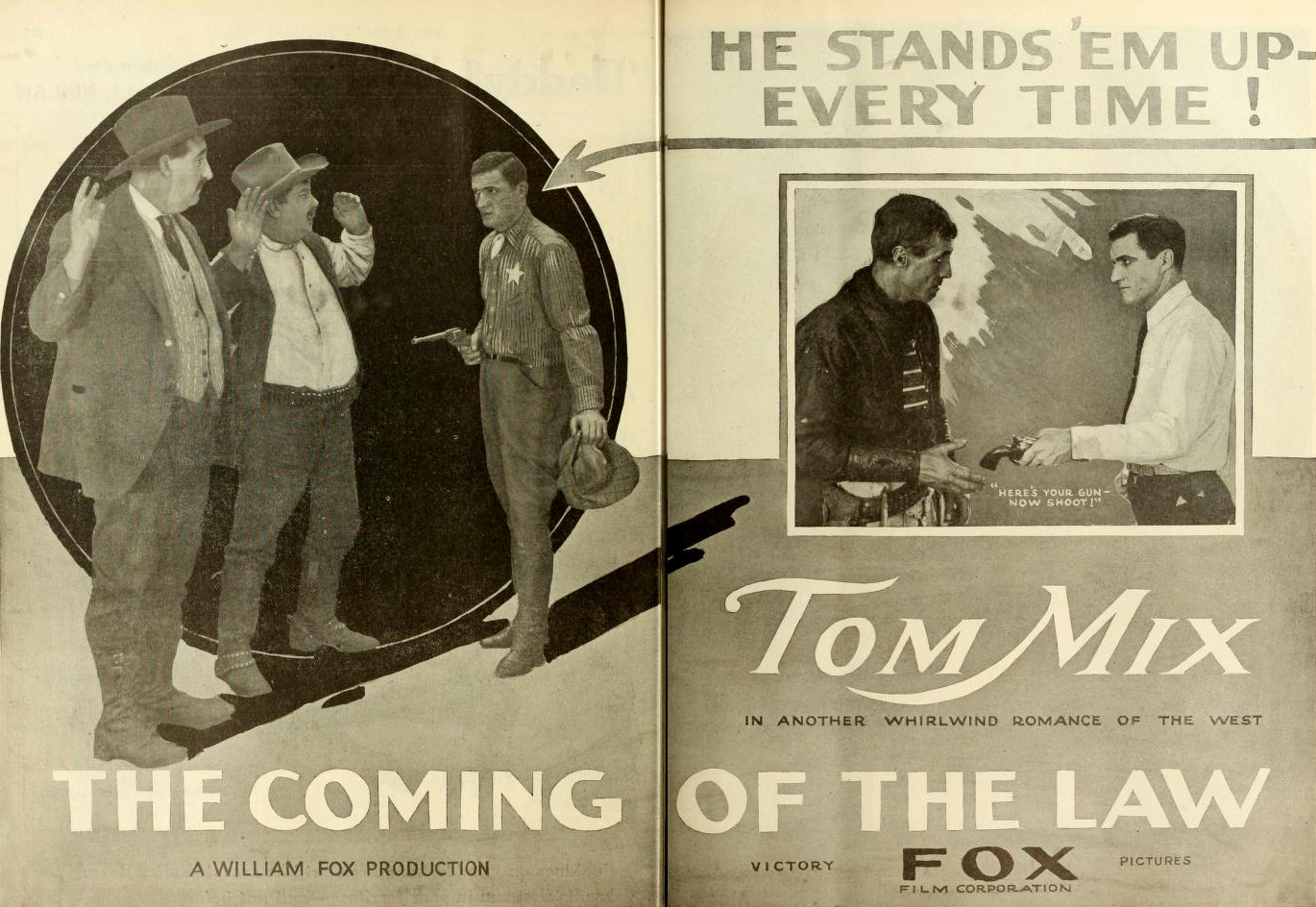
- Directed by: Arthur Rosson
- Written by: Charles Alden Seltzer (novel); Denison Clift; Arthur Rosson
- Produced by: Sol M. Wurtzel
- Starring: Tom Mix; Agnes Vernon; George Nichols
- Cinematography: Fred LeRoy Granville
- Production company: Fox Film
- Distributed by: Fox Film
- Release date: May 11, 1919
- Running time: 50 minutes
- Country: United States
- Languages: Silent; English intertitles

The Coming of the Law is a 1919 American silent Western film directed by Arthur Rosson and starring Tom Mix, Agnes Vernon and George Nichols.

== Cast ==
- Tom Mix as Kent Hollis
- Agnes Vernon as Nellie Hazelton
- George Nichols as Big Bill Dunlavey
- Jack Curtis as Judge Graney
- Sid Jordan as Neal Norton
- Bowditch M. Turner as Potter
- Charles Le Moyne as Ten Spot
- Pat Chrisman as Yuma Ed
- Lewis Sargent as Jiggs
- Jack Dill as Ace
- Harry Dunkinson as Sheriff
- Buck Jones as Henchman
