= Flirting with Death =

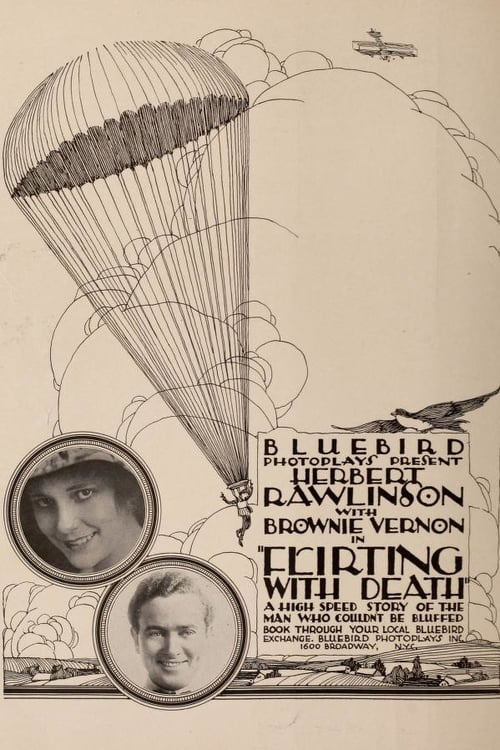
- Directed by: Elmer Clifton
- Written by: Waldemar Young
- Starring: Herbert Rawlinson; Agnes Vernon; Frank MacQuarrie
- Production company: Universal Pictures
- Distributed by: Universal Pictures
- Release date: September 18, 1917
- Running time: 50 minutes
- Country: United States
- Languages: Silent; English intertitles

Flirting with Death is a 1917 American silent comedy film directed by Elmer Clifton and starring Herbert Rawlinson, Agnes Vernon and Frank MacQuarrie.

== Cast ==
- Herbert Rawlinson as 'Sky High' Billy Wardwell
- Agnes Vernon as Jane Higginbotham
- Frank MacQuarrie as 'Domino' Dominick
- Mark Fenton as Dave Higginbotham
- Doc Crane as Ed Warmbath
- Fred Unger as Murphy

== Bibliography ==
- James Robert Parish & Michael R. Pitts. Film directors: a guide to their American films. Scarecrow Press, 1974.
