= Bare-Fisted Gallagher =

1919 film

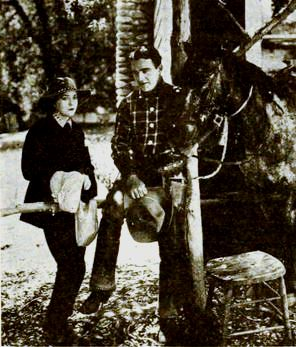
- Agnes Vernon and William Desmond in Bare-Fisted Gallagher
- Directed by: Joseph J. Franz
- Written by: William Parker
- Produced by: Jesse D. Hampton
- Starring: William Desmond
- Distributed by: Robertson-Cole
- Release date: June 22, 1919
- Running time: 5 reels
- Country: United States
- Languages: Silent; English intertitles

Bare-Fisted Gallagher is a lost 1919 American silent Western film directed by Joseph J. Franz and starring William Desmond. It was produced by Jesse D. Hampton and released through Robertson-Cole soon to amalgamate into Film Booking Offices of America (FBO).

== Plot ==
Bare-fisted Gallagher has inherited a mine from his uncle. Gallagher falls in love with a woman bandit, whom he has rescued from an attack by Aliso Pete. Aliso owns the general store, but also turns out to be another bandit. Gallagher convinces Jem to reform.

== Cast ==
- William Desmond as Bare-Fisted Gallagher
- Agnes Vernon as Jem Mason
- Arthur Millett as Selby Mason
- Frank Lanning as Aliso Pete
- Caroline Rankin as The Old Maid
- Bill Patton as Driver #1
- Scotty MacGregor as Driver #2
- Tom Ashton as Mexican Boy (* uncredited)
