= The Clean-Up (1917 film) =

1917 film

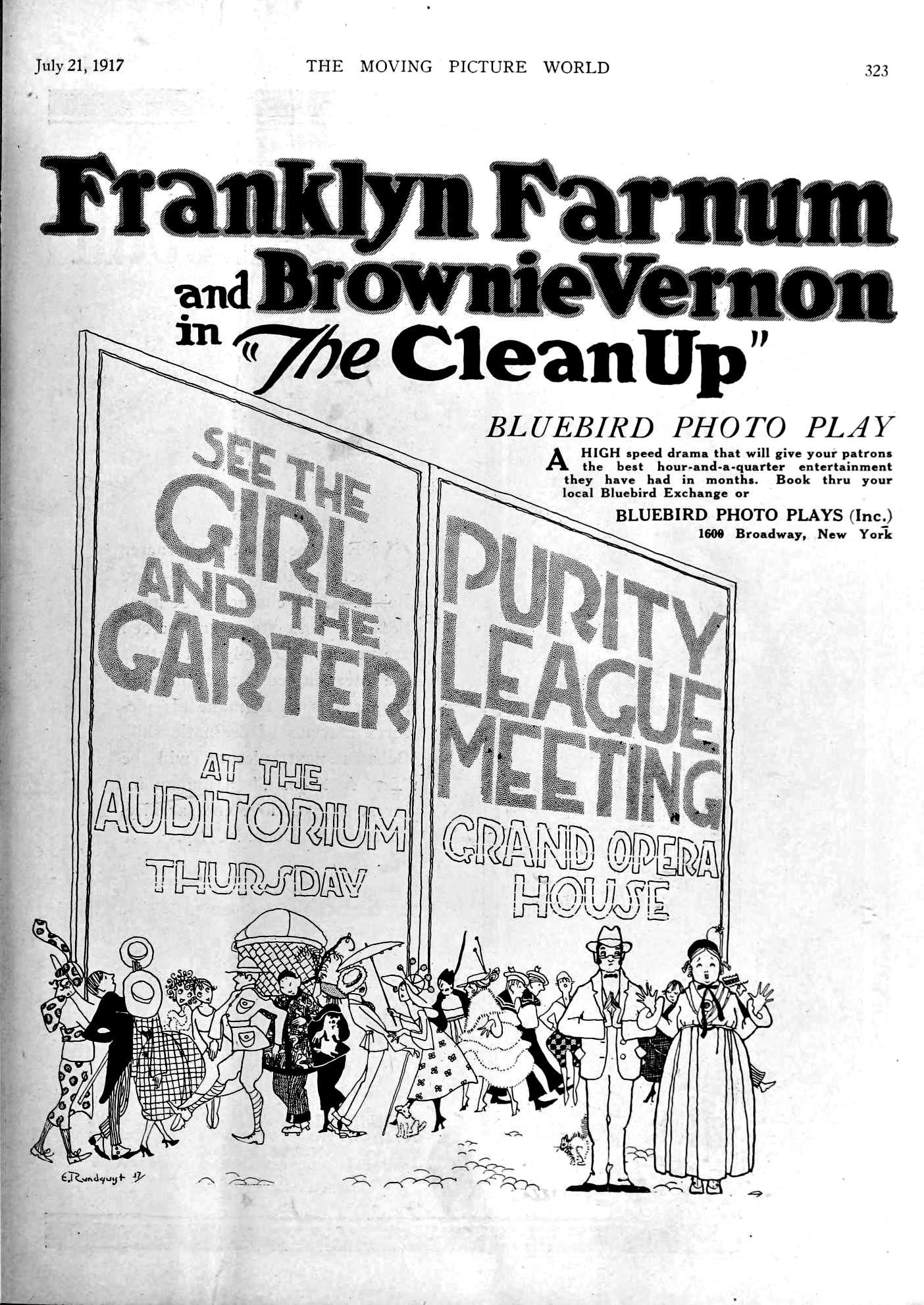
- Motion Picture World Full Page ad 1917
- Directed by: William Worthington
- Written by: Waldemar Young
- Starring: Franklyn Farnum; Agnes Vernon; Mark Fenton
- Cinematography: Friend Baker
- Production company: Universal Pictures
- Distributed by: Universal Pictures
- Release date: August 6, 1917
- Running time: 50 minutes
- Country: United States
- Languages: Silent; English intertitles

The Clean-Up is a 1917 American silent comedy Western film directed by William Worthington and starring Franklyn Farnum, Agnes Vernon and Mark Fenton.

== Cast ==
- Franklyn Farnum as Stuart Adams
- Agnes Vernon as Hazel Richards
- Mark Fenton as James Richards
- Mae Talbot as Mrs. Richards
- Martha Mattox as Miss Richards
- Claire McDowell as Vera Vincent
- Clyde Benson as Joe Byers
- Albert MacQuarrie as Ed Linder
- William Human as Wilbur McBean

== Bibliography ==
- Robert B. Connelly. The Silents: Silent Feature Films, 1910-36, Volume 40, Issue 2. December Press, 1998.
