= Friend Baker =

American cinematographer (1890 - 1988)

- Born: Friend Frederick Baker; April 10, 1890; Nebraska, US
- Died: March 20, 1988 (aged 98); Orange, California, US
- Occupation: Cinematographer
- Spouse: Annabelle Jackson

Friend Baker was an American cinematographer who worked in Hollywood in the 1910s and 1920s. Later on in his career, he worked as a camera technician. He was an early member of the American Society of Cinematographers.

== Biography ==
Friend was born in Nebraska to Jesse Baker and Jennie Wallace.

Among his innovations as a cameraman, he reportedly built an early 3-D camera alongside fellow cinematographer Virgil Williams while working at Universal Pictures in 1918. He also developed an early technique for produced color film. He served as chief cameraman for the studio for a number of years.

He married Annabelle Jackson in Los Angeles in 1915. The pair had several children.

== Selected filmography ==
- Heart's Haven (1922)
- The Gray Dawn (1922)
- While the Devil Laughs (1921)
- The Girl of My Heart (1920)
- Trumpet Island (1920)
- Merely Mary Ann (1920)
- The Broken Commandments (1919)
- Chasing Rainbows (1919)
- The Sneak (1919)
- The Rebellious Bride (1919)
- Hell-Roarin' Reform (1919)
- The Call of the Soul (1919)
- Kultur (1918)
- The Bird of Prey (1918)
- The Scarlet Road (1918)
- The Devil's Wheel (1918)
- Nobody's Wife (1918)
- Painted Lips (1918)
- Her American Husband (1918)
- Cheyenne's Pal (1917)
- The Clean-Up (1917)
- The Car of Chance (1917)
- The Clock (1917)
- The Man Who Took a Chance (1917)
- The Devil's Pay Day (1917)
- Love Never Dies (1916)
- What Love Can Do (1916)
- The Long Chance (1915)
