= By the Sun's Rays =

1914 film

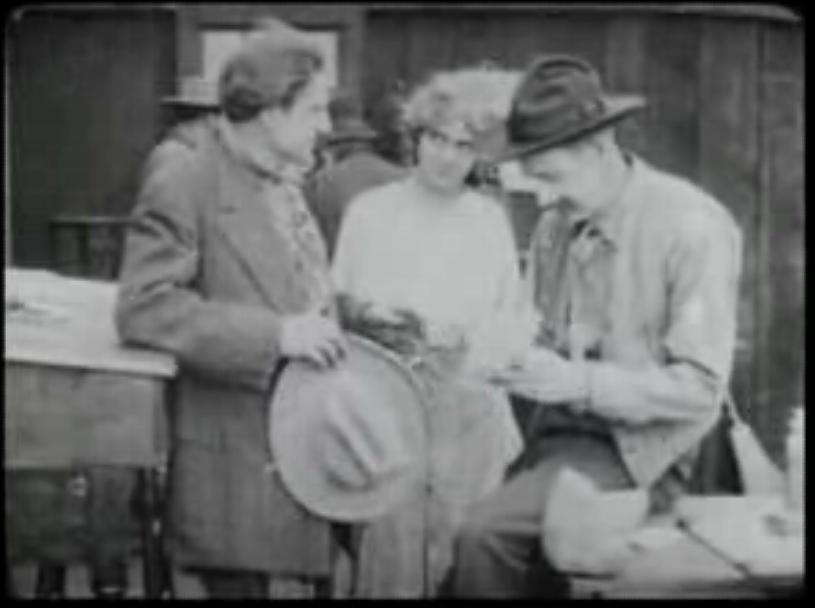
- Screenshot
- Directed by: Charles Giblyn
- Produced by: Nestor Film Co.
- Starring: Murdock MacQuarrie; Lon Chaney
- Distributed by: Universal Pictures
- Release date: July 22, 1914
- Running time: 11 minutes
- Country: United States
- Languages: Silent; English intertitles

By the Sun's Rays is a 1914 American short silent Western film directed by Charles Giblyn and featuring Lon Chaney and Murdock MacQuarrie. It is one of the earliest surviving films of Lon Chaney, with several prints existing in private film collections and a video release in 1995. A still from the film exists showing Lon Chaney in the role of the villainous "Frank Lawlor".

== Plot ==
By the Sun's Rays (1914)

A gang of bandits keeps robbing the gold shipments from a Colorado mining company each time one is sent out. A detective named John Murdock is asked to assist mine superintendent John Davis in finding the culprits. The office clerk, Frank Lawler, is in love with Davis' daughter Dora but his advances are rejected by the girl who loves Murdock instead. After another shipment arrives, Murdock assembles a posse. He discovers that Lawler has been sneaking out of the office and using a mirror to signal the bandits to alert them to the arrival of the gold shipments.

With the town's men off in the woods, Lawler attempts to molest Dora in the mining office and she tries to hold him off until help arrives. After the bandits are arrested, the posse returns to the office, and Murdock catches Lawler in the act of assaulting Dora. Murdock produces the mirror from Lawler's desk drawer, and accuses him of complicity with the robberies. Lawler attempts to escape but he is shot dead in the street by one of the deputies. Murdock winds up getting the girl.

== Cast ==
- Murdock MacQuarrie as Detective John Murdock
- Lon Chaney as Frank Lawler, the clerk
- Seymour Hastings as John Davis
- Agnes Vernon as Dora Davis
- Richard (Dick) Rosson as a bandit
- Eddie Lyons

== Reception ==
Moving Picture World called it "A western number of about average interest". Motion Picture News stated: "An old plot but the novel manner in which it is worked makes it interesting....The picture will appeal more to lovers of westerns than others".
