= Charles Giblyn =

American film director

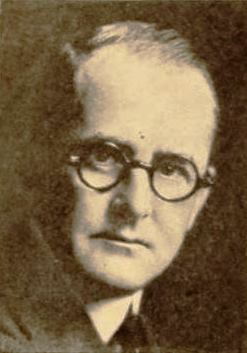
- Giblyn, from an advertisement promoting Fox Film directors, Exhibitors Herald, 1920
- Born: September 6, 1871; Watertown, New York, U.S.
- Died: March 14, 1934 (aged 62); Los Angeles, California, U.S.
- Occupations: Actor; director; producer
- Years active: 1912-1934

Charles Giblyn (September 6, 1871 – March 14, 1934) was an American film director and actor of the silent era. He directed nearly 100 films between 1912 and 1927. He also appeared in 23 films between 1914 and 1934. He was one of the founders of the Motion Picture Directors Association.

Beginning in 1914, Giblyn worked with the Universal Motion Picture Manufacturing Company. Giblyn was the screenwriter for Scandal (1917). He founded Albion Productions, a film production company, in 1922.

On Broadway, Giblyn acted in The Song of the Sword (1899), Wheels Within Wheels (1899), and The Ambassador (1900).

Giblyn was born in Watertown, New York, and died in Los Angeles, California.

== Selected filmography ==
- The Battle of Gettysburg (1913)
- By the Sun's Rays (1914)
- The Oubliette (1914)
- The Higher Law (1914)
- Peggy (1916)
- Not My Sister (1916)
- The Vagabond Prince (1916)
- The Price She Paid (1917)
- The Lesson (1917)
- Scandal (1917)
- The Honeymoon (1917)
- Let's Get a Divorce (1918)
- The Studio Girl (1918)
- Just for Tonight (1918)
- A Perfect 36 (1918)
- The Spite Bride (1919)
- Upstairs and Down (1919)
- The Dark Mirror (1920)
- Know Your Men (1921)
- Singing River (1921)
- A Woman's Woman (1922), director and producer
- The Mountain Woman (1922)
- The Leavenworth Case (1923)
- The Hypocrites (1923)
- The Adventurous Sex (1925)
- Ladies Beware (1927)
- The Wright Idea (1928)
- The Mysterious Dr. Fu Manchu (1929)
- Woman Trap (1929)
- Playboy of Paris (1930)
- Party Girl (1930)
- Prosperity (1932)
