= Lord John's Journal =

- Directed by: Edward J. Le Saint
- Written by: Harvey Gates
- Starring: William Garwood; Stella Razetto; Ogden Crane; Walter Belasco; Jay Belasco; T. D. Crittenden; Doc Crane; Grace Benham; Laura Oakley; Albert MacQuarrie; Gretchen Lederer
- Distributed by: Universal Film Manufacturing Company
- Running time: 16 reels (total for 5 films)
- Country: United States
- Language: English

Lord John's Journal (also known as The Journal of Lord John) is a 5-episode series of American silent mystery films, directed by Edward J. Le Saint and based on a story by Harvey Gates. It stars William Garwood in the lead role.

== Episodes ==
The five episodes are as follows:

1. Lord John in New York (1915; 4 reels)
2. The Grey Sisterhood (1916; 3 reels)
3. Three Fingered Jenny (1916; 3 reels)
4. The Eye of Horus (1916; 3 reels)
5. The League of the Future (1916; 3 reels)

== Cast ==
- William Garwood as Lord John Haselmore
- Stella Razetto as Maida Odell
- Ogden Crane as Roger Odell
- Walter Belasco as Paola Tostini
- Jay Belasco as Antonio Tostini
- T. D. Crittenden as Carr Price
- Doc Crane as L.J. Calit
- Grace Benham as Grace Callender
- Laura Oakley as Head Sister
- Albert MacQuarrie as Doctor Ramese
- Gretchen Lederer
