= A. M. Williamson =

American-English author (1858–1933)

Alice Muriel Williamson
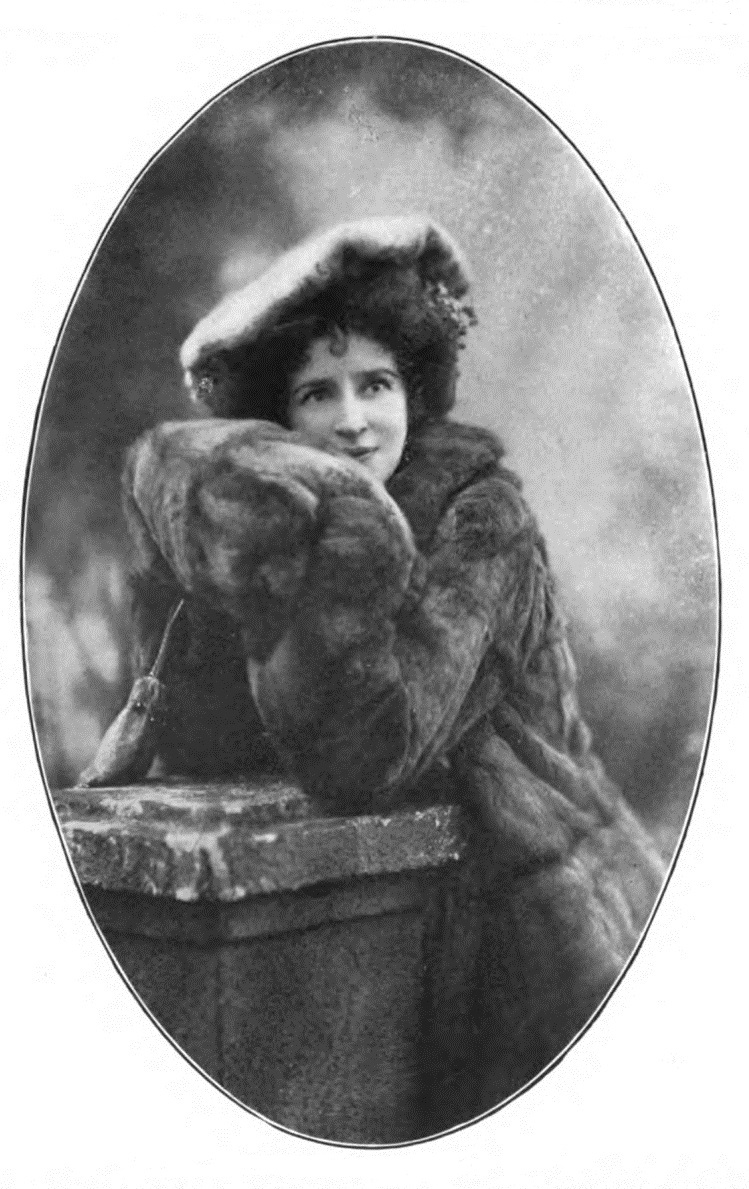
- Born: Alice Muriel King; 8 October 1858; Cleveland, Ohio
- Died: 24 September 1933 (aged 74); Bath, England
- Resting place: Bath Abbey
- Occupation: Writer
- Spouse: Charles Norris Williamson m.1894
- Writing career
- Pen name: Alice Stuyvesant, John Colin Dane, William Allison, Alice Livingston
- Language: English

Alice Muriel Williamson (8 October 1858 – 24 September 1933), who published chiefly under names the C. N. and A. M. Williamson and Mrs. C. N. Williamson, was an American-English author.

== Biography ==
She was born 8 October 1858 to parents Marcus and Jane (Thomas) King in Cleveland, Ohio, where her father was co-founder of the Ohio State and Union Law College. In 1890, she adopted the surname "Livingston" from her maternal great-grandfather following separation from her first husband, Lieutenant William Reeve Hamilton, who disapproved of her budding career as an actress. In 1892, she expatriated herself to England (and from her first husband) as foreign correspondent for the Boston Evening Transcript, supplying that paper with approximately 120 "letters" between 1892 and 1897 before devoting herself full-time to fiction, although she remained an occasional freelance journalist for the rest of her life. Two years after arriving in England, she married magazine editor Charles Norris Williamson (1857–1920) whom she persuaded to appear as co-author for many of her books, later acknowledging her sole authorship.

Her success as an author, in its early stages, was owing to Alfred Harmsworth who, recognizing her talent, promoted her stories – especially sensational serials – in the Daily Mail and his many other publications. Her first serial, "Confessions of a Stage-Struck Girl," appeared in Forget-Me-Not (August 11-November 17, 1894), partly inspired by her earlier career as an actress in America, as was her first novel, The Barnstormers (1897), written at the suggestion of S. R. Crockett upon hearing her describe some of her theatrical experiences at a dinner party. Her second novel, A Woman in Grey (1898), established her reputation as a worthy successor to Wilkie Collins. A third, The Newspaper Girl (1899), exploited Elizabeth Banks's "stunt" journalism, turning some of the same stratagems to humorous effect. Humor would become one of her most striking characteristics as an author, beginning with The Lightning Conductor (1902), the novel that catapulted her overnight to international fame, selling more than a million copies in America. James Milne, in Memoirs of a Bookman (1934), speaks of a "tradition" that she was "the wittiest girl who ever invaded Fleet Street."

Although best known for her series of motor travel romances, she was a literary polymath adept at a wide variety of genres (detective, mystery, Gothic, spy, adventure, war, ghost, fairy, satire, fictional memoir, muckraking, etc.), often published anonymously or pseudonymously, such as Champion: The Story of a Motor Car (1907) as by John Colin Dane (memoirs narrated by the car itself), and her sensational exposé of German war plans on the eve of World War I, What I Found Out in the House of a German Prince (1915), purporting to be "by an American-English Governess," the latter so realistic that it was accepted as a true account and published serially in the Fortnightly Review.

She died on 24 September 1933 under strange circumstances. She was found unconscious in a hotel in Bath with sleeping tablets scattered on the floor. Doctors tried to save her but were unsuccessful. She reportedly lost more than $150,000 in the US market crash. An inquest ruled that she died of accidental poising and did not intend to commit suicide. An executor of her estate told the inquest that she was not in financial difficulties despite her losses in America.

Her remains are interred next to those of her husband in Bath Abbey Cemetery.

== Works ==
- The Barnstomers: Being the Tragical Side of a Comedy (1897)
- Berry Goes to Monte Carlo (1921)
- The Botor Chaperon (1907); and (sl) Grand Magazine August 1906-March 1907
- The Car of Destiny (1907)
- The Career of Joan Carthew (aka The Girl Who Had Nothing) - serialised in the Windsor Magazine December 1903 to May 1904
- The Case of Ann Arthur, (nv) Five-Novels Monthly March 1930
- The Castle of Shadows (1909)
- Champion: The Story of a Motor Car (1907) with illustrations by Walter Ernest Webster
- The Chauffeur and the Chaperon (1908); and (sl) The Delineator July 1906-August 1907
- The Darkened Room, (nv) Five-Novels Monthly April 1933
- The Diamond Code, (nv) Five-Novels Monthly March 1932
- The Door Between, (nv) Five-Novels Monthly December 1932
- Duchess, Behave!, (nv) Five-Novels Monthly June 1929 (with Sydney Arundel)
- The Eccentricity of Fleetwood, (ss) Strand Magazine (UK) July 1901, (US) August 1901
- The Flower Forbidden, (sl) Smith's Magazine April–June 1911
- The Girl with One Dress, (sl) Motion Picture Magazine April–September 1927
- The Golden Silence (1910)
- The Heather Moon (1912)
- To M.L.G., or, He who passed (1912)
- The Hidden House, (sl) Cavalier 1913–1914 (as Alice Stuyvesant)
- Honeymoon Hate, (nv) The Saturday Evening Post, July 9–16, 1927
- The House by the Lock (1899)
- The House of Silence (1921); and (nv) Five-Novels Monthly December 1931
- The Inky Way (1931)
- It Happened in Egypt (1914)
- Lady Betty Across the Water (1906)
- Lady Betty Crosses the Ocean, (sl), Ladies Home Journal October 1905-April 1906
- The Lady in Gray, (nv) Five-Novels Monthly September 1932
- The Lightning Conductor (1902)
- The Lightning Conductress (1916)
- The Lightning Conductor Comes Back (1933)
- The Lion's Mouse, (sl) Munsey's February–August 1918
- Lord John, (ss) Argosy (UK) July 1933
- The Love Pirate (1913)
- The Love Trees, (ss) Munsey's December 1915
- The Man from Joliet, (nv) Short Stories August 1915
- The Motor Maid (1909)
- The Murder House, (nv) Five-Novels Monthly October 1932
- My Lady Cinderella (1906)
- Passport, (nv) Five-Novels Monthly September 1930
- The Port of Adventure (1913)
- The Princess Passes, (sl) Metropolitan Magazine July 1904-April 1905
- The Princess Virginia, (sl) Ladies Home Journal August 1906-January 1907
- Publicity for Anne (1926); and (sl) Charm, November 1925-January 1926
- A Real English Christmas with Lady Betty, (ss) Ladies Home Journal December 1906
- The Red Pen Murder, (nv) Five-Novels Monthly January 1931
- Rosemary, A Christmas Story (1906)
- The Scarlet Runner (May 1908) - serialised in the Strand Magazine December 1906 to November 1907
- The Sea Could Tell (1904); and (nv) Five-Novels Monthly October 1929
- The Second Latchkey (1920)
- Secret Gold (1925); and (sl) Country Gentleman September 20-November 8, 1924
- A Secret of the Sea (1920)
- Set in Silver (1909)
- The Shop-Girl (1916); and (nv) Munsey's July 1914
- The Silent Battle (1902)
- This Woman to This Man (1917); and (sl) All-Story Weekly April 15-May 20, 1916
- Tiger Ride, (nv) Five-Novels Monthly June 1931
- The Truth About Tanita, (nv) Five-Novels Monthly September 1931
- The Underground Syndicate, (1911); and (nv) Five-Novels Monthly July 1932
- The Vanity Box (1911) (as Alice Stuyvesant)
- The War Wedding (1916)
- What’s in a Name?, (ss) The New Passing Show, May 14, 1932
- A Woman in Gray (1898)
- A Woman Tried to Steal My Husband, (ar) Cosmopolitan, October 1925
- The Woman Who Dared (1903)

== Translations ==
Her mystery A Woman in Grey (1898) was translated and adapted into Japanese by Kuroiwa Ruiko (黒岩涙香) under the title Yūrei tō (幽霊塔; Ghost Tower) in 1901, and it was adapted by Edogawa Rampo (江戸川乱歩) in 1937–1938. Translations of her novels and newspaper serials appeared throughout Europe, particularly in France, Holland and Switzerland.

== Filmography ==
- The Lightning Conductor (1914)
- The House of the Lost Court (1915)
- Lord John in New York (1915)
- The Grey Sisterhood (1916, short)
- Lord Loveland Discovers America (1916)
- Three Fingered Jenny (1916, short)
- The Eye of Horus (1916, short)
- The League of the Future (1916, short)
- The Shop Girl (1916)
- The Scarlet Runner (1916, serial)
- The Woman Who Dared (1916)
- The Life Mask (1918)
- The Demon (1918)
- A Woman in Grey (1920, serial)
- Passion's Playground (1920)
- My Lady's Latchkey (1921)
- The Lion's Mouse (UK, 1923)
- My Friend the Chauffeur (Germany, 1926)
- Honeymoon Hate (1927)
- The Man Without a Face (1928, serial)
- El príncipe gondolero (Spanish language, 1931)
- Yūrei tō (Japan, 1948)
