= C. N. Williamson =

British writer and journalist (1859–1920)

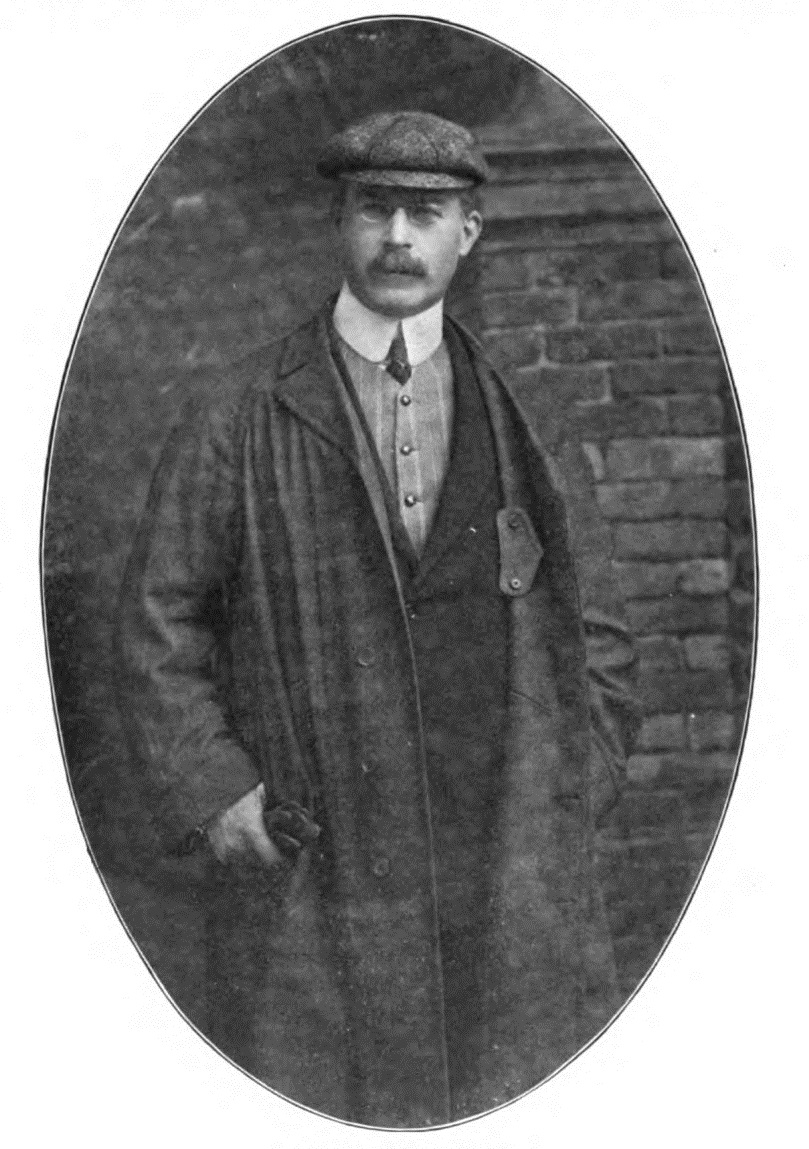
Portrait of Charles Norris Williamson

Charles Norris "C. N." Williamson (1859–1920) was a British writer, motoring journalist and founder of the Black and White Magazine who was perhaps best known for his collaboration with his wife, Alice Muriel Williamson, in a number of novels and travelogues.

== Biography ==
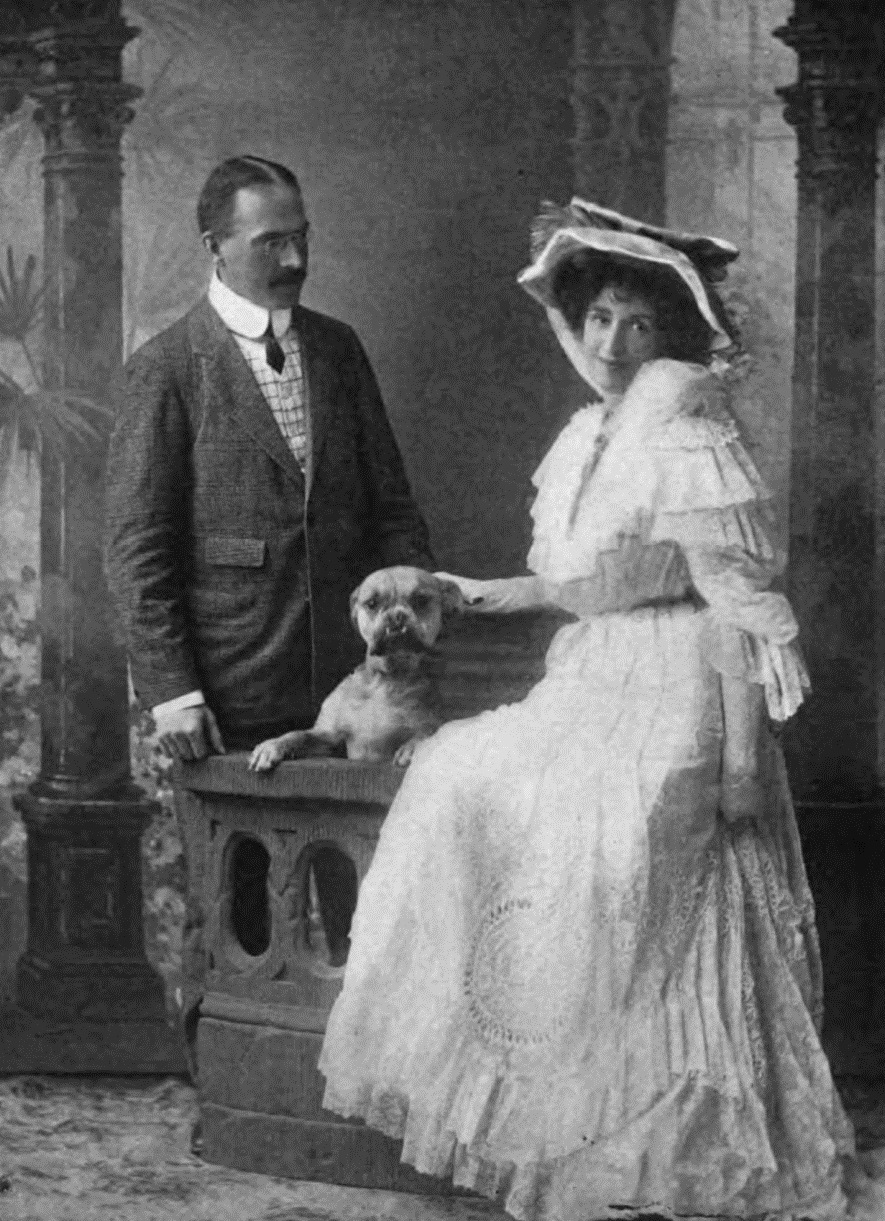
C. N. and his wife, A. M. Williamson

Born in Exeter, Williamson was educated at University College, London, where he studied engineering. He spent eight years as a journalist on The Graphic before establishing the Black and White in 1891 as founding editor. He published a Life of Carlyle in 1881. Several of the Williamsons' short stories and novels later became films.

Charles Norris Williamson wrote many of his published works in partnership with his wife, Alice who he married in 1894; she apparently said of him "Charlie Williamson could do anything in the world except write stories": she also said "I can't do anything else." Charles wrote some novels on his own, as did Alice after her husband's death

He died at Combe Down, Bath, on Sunday 3 October 1920.

== Works ==
=== Edited by C. N. Williamson and R. H. Shepherd ===
- Memoirs of Carlyle with Personal Reminiscences and Selections from His Private Letters (2 vols; 1881)

=== Authored by C. N. and A. M. Williamson ===
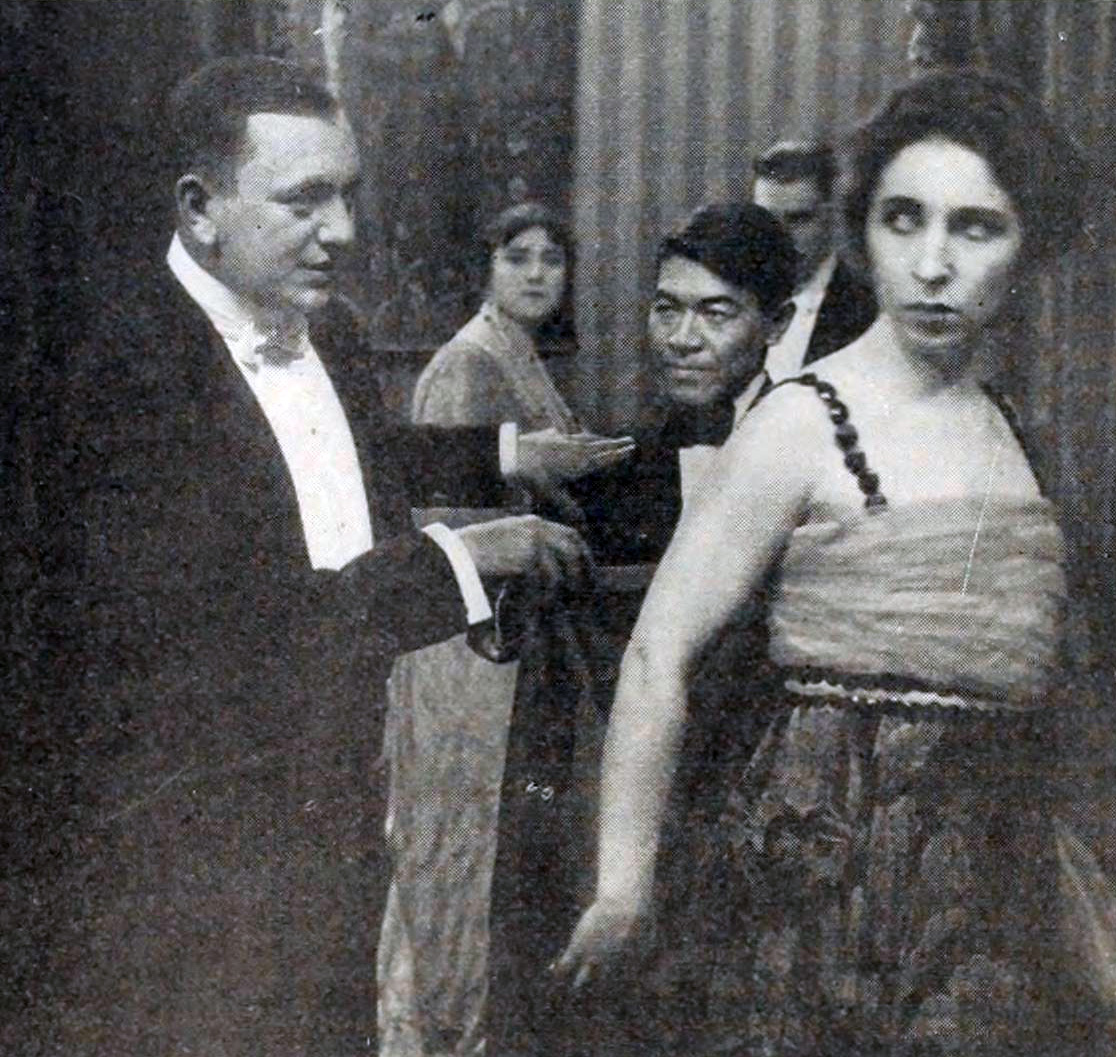
The Shop Girl (1916)

- "The Eccentricity of Fleetwood" in The Strand Magazine (US) (August 1901)
- The Lightning Conductor (1902)
- The Princess Passes in Metropolitan Magazine (October–November 1904)
- "Lady Betty Crosses the Ocean" in Ladies' Home Journal (October 1905)
- My Friend the Chauffeur (1905)
- Lady Betty Across the Water (1906)
- "Lady Betty Runs Away" in Ladies' Home Journal (January 1906)
- The Botor Chaperon in The Grand Magazine (August 1906 – January 1907)
- "The Chauffeur and the Chaperon" in The Delineator (October 1906)
- The Princess Virginia in Ladies' Home Journal (October 1906 – January 1907)
- "A Real English Christmas with Lady Betty" in Ladies Home Journal (December 1906)
- Scarlet Runner in The Strand Magazine (December 1906 – November 1907); published as a novel in 1908
- The Car of Destiny (1907)
- Set in Silver (1909)
- The Motor Maid (1910)
- The Golden Silence (1910)
- Flower Forbidden part 1 in Smith's Magazine (April 1911)
- The Heather Moon (1912)
- Champion: The Story of a Motor Car (1913)
- The Love Pirate (1913)
- The Port of Adventure (1913)
- "The Shop-Girl" in Munsey's Magazine (July 1914)
- It Happened in Egypt (1914)
- "The Love Trees" in Munsey's Magazine (December 1915)
- This Woman to This Man in All-Story Weekly (29 April – 13 May 1916)
- The War Wedding (1916)
- The Lightning Conductress (1916)
- The Shop-Girl (1916)
- The Lion's Mouse in Munsey's Magazine (February–August 1918)
- The Second Latchkey (1920)
- Berry Goes to Monte Carlo (1921)
- The Great Pearl Secret (1921)

For an unknown period, but certainly in the 1890s he edited (or "conducted") a 1 penny fortnightly periodical entitled The Minute, illustrated, a sort of Reader's Digest of contemporary Victorian society, supported by much advertising.

== Filmography ==
- The Lightning Conductor (1914)
- Lord John in New York (1915)
- The Grey Sisterhood (1916, short)
- Lord Loveland Discovers America (1916)
- Three Fingered Jenny (1916, short)
- The Eye of Horus (1916, short)
- The League of the Future (1916, short)
- The Shop Girl (1916)
- The Scarlet Runner (1916, serial)
- The Demon (1918)
- A Woman in Grey (1920, serial)
- Passion's Playground (1920)
- My Lady's Latchkey (1921)
- The Lion's Mouse (UK, 1923)
- My Friend the Chauffeur (Germany, 1926)
- The Man Without a Face (1928, serial)
- Yūrei tō (Japan, 1948)
