= Lord John in New York =

1915 film by Edward LeSaint

- Directed by: Edward J. Le Saint
- Written by: Harvey Gates (Scenario)
- Story by: A.M. Williamson (short story); C.N. Williamson (short story)
- Starring: William Garwood; Stella Razetto; Ogden Crane; Walter Belasco; Jay Belasco
- Distributed by: Universal Film Manufacturing Company
- Release date: December 14, 1915
- Running time: 4 reels
- Country: United States
- Languages: Silent film English intertitles

Lord John in New York is a 1915 American silent mystery film directed by Edward J. Le Saint based on a story by C.N. and A.M. Williamson. Starring William Garwood in the lead role, it was the first film in the five-film series of Lord John's Journal. The film was considered lost, although the Library of Congress shows a copy held in the US Archive.

== Cast ==
- William Garwood as Lord John
- Stella Razeto as Maida Odell
- Ogden Crane as Roger Odell
- Walter Belasco as Paola Tostini
- Jay Belasco as Antonio Tostini
- T. D. Crittenden as Carr Price
- Doc Crane as L.J. Calit
- Grace Benham as Grace Callender
- Laura Oakley as Head Sister
- Albert MacQuarrie as Doctor Ramese
- Gretchen Lederer

== See also ==
- The Grey Sisterhood (1916)
- Three Fingered Jenny (1916)
- The Eye of Horus (1916)
- The League of the Future (1916)
