= Judge Not; or The Woman of Mona Diggings =

1915 film

- Directed by: Robert Z. Leonard
- Written by: Peter B. Kyne; Robert Z. Leonard; Harvey Gates
- Produced by: Robert Z. Leonard
- Starring: Harry Carey
- Cinematography: R. E. Irish
- Distributed by: Universal Film Manufacturing Company
- Release date: September 27, 1915
- Running time: 60 minutes; 6 reels
- Country: United States
- Language: Silent with English intertitles

Judge Not; or The Woman of Mona Diggings is a 1915 American drama film starring Julia Dean and featuring Harry Carey.

== Cast ==
- Julia Dean as Molly Hanlon
- Harry Carter as Lee Kirk
- Harry Carey as Miles Rand
- Marc Robbins as Judge Rand
- Kingsley Benedict as Clarence Van Dyne
- Joseph Singleton as Minister (credited as Joe Singleton)
- Paul Machette as Joe "Texas Joe"
- Lydia Yeamans Titus as The Housekeeper
- Walter Belasco as The Barkeeper
- Hoot Gibson as Undetermined Role (uncredited)

== See also ==
- Harry Carey filmography
- Hoot Gibson filmography
