= Edward LeSaint =

American actor (1871–1940)

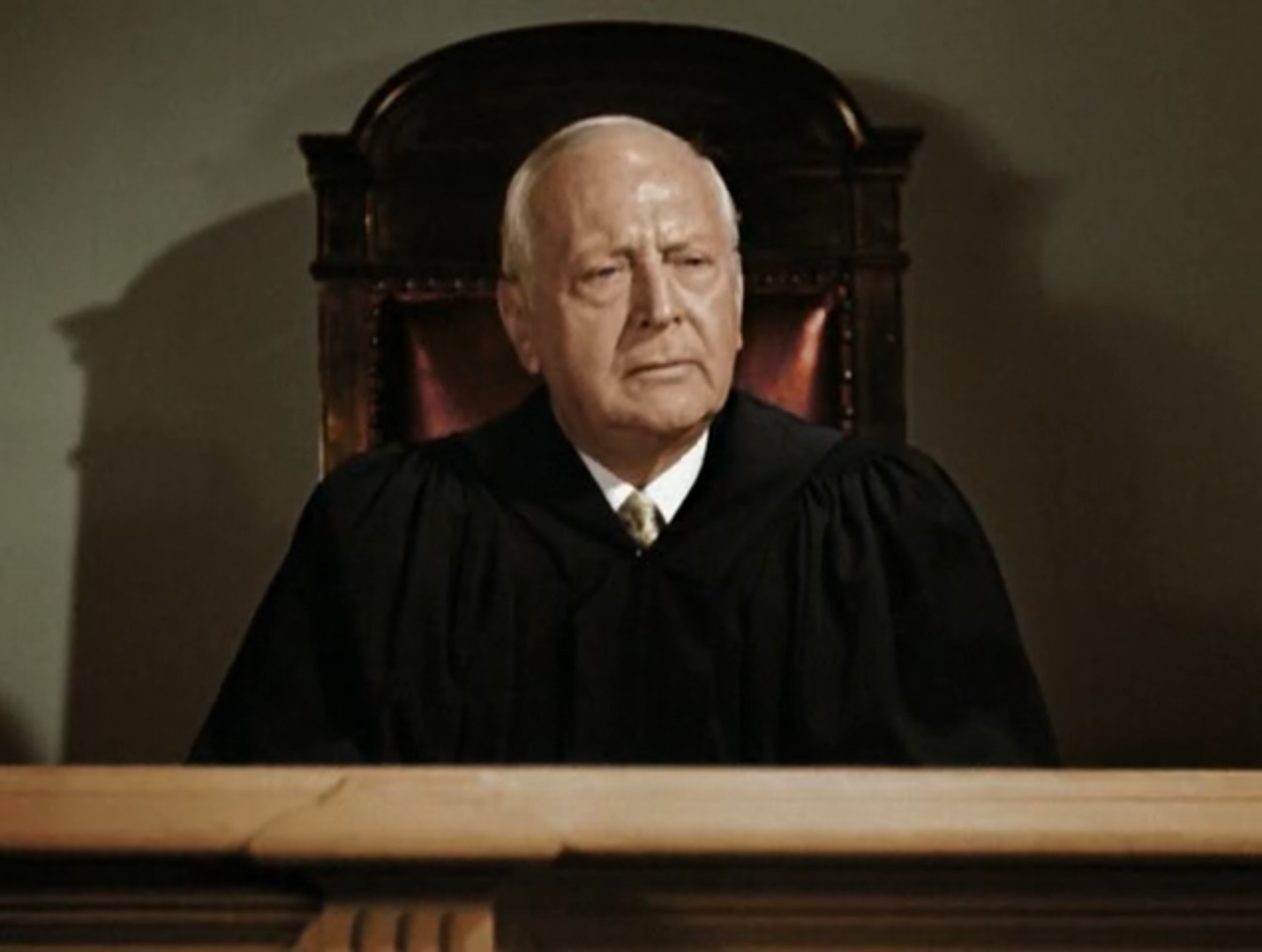
- LeSaint in short film Disorder in the Court (1936)
- Born: January 1, 1871; Cincinnati, Ohio, U.S.
- Died: September 10, 1940 (aged 69); Los Angeles, California, U.S.
- Resting place: Hollywood Forever Cemetery
- Other names: Edward J. Le Saint
- Occupations: Actor; director
- Spouse: Stella Razetto (m. 1913)

Edward LeSaint (January 1, 1871 – September 10, 1940) was an American stage and film actor and director whose career began in the silent era. He acted in over 300 films and directed more than 90. He was sometimes credited as Edward J. Le Saint. LeSaint typically portrayed characters in roles of authority, including over 30 roles, both credited and uncredited, as a judge.

== Early years ==
LeSaint was born in Cincinnati, Ohio, of Belgian and German ancestry. His schooling also was in Cincinnati. Before venturing into entertainment, he worked in a railroad's auditing office.

== Career ==
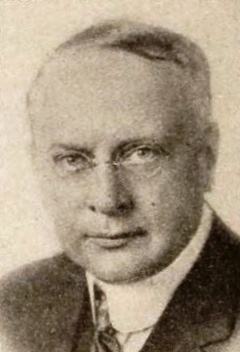
From a 1920 magazine ad

LeSaint acted with a stock theatre company in Cincinnati for a couple of years, then spent 15 years acting "in most of the prominent road shows all over the states." On Broadway, LeSaint appeared (billed as Edward J. Le Saint) in Robert Emmet (1904), The Big Fight (1928), and Houseparty (1929).

He went on to work with the Kinemacolor Company of America and Selig Polyscope Company in film production before he joined Universal Pictures. He had a bit part as a judge in Too Many Women (1934).

LeSaint directed approximately 50 films from 1912 to 1916.

== Personal life and death ==
He was married to Stella Razetto. He died on September 10, 1940, in Hollywood, aged 69. He was buried in Hollywood Forever Cemetery.

== Selected filmography ==
=== As actor ===
- Spellbound (1916) - Katti Hab
- Mary of the Movies (1923) - Himself (uncredited)
- The Talk of Hollywood (1929) - Edward Hamilton
- Shadow of the Law (1930) - Judge (uncredited)
- For the Defense (1930) - Judge at First Trial (uncredited)
- Manslaughter (1930) - Curtis (uncredited)
- The Costello Case (1930)
- The Dawn Trail (1930) - Amos
- Mothers Cry (1930) - Warden (uncredited)
- The Last Parade (1931) - Chief of Police (uncredited)
- Millie (1931) - Judge (uncredited)
- Gentleman's Fate (1931) - Detective Meyers (uncredited)
- City Streets (1931) - Shooting Gallery Patron (uncredited)
- Sky Raiders (1931) - Bradford
- Kick In (1931) - Purnell, Chick's Boss
- A Free Soul (1931) - Judge (uncredited)
- The Lawyer's Secret (1931) - Prison Warden (uncredited)
- The Miracle Woman (1931) - Parishioner (uncredited)
- Huckleberry Finn (1931) - Doc Robinson (uncredited)
- Caught (1931) - Haverstraw
- Graft (1931) - Newspaper Printer (uncredited)
- The Beloved Bachelor (1931) - Mayor of San Francisco (uncredited)
- Girls About Town (1931) - Party Guest (uncredited)
- The Fighting Marshal (1931) - Warden Decker
- Range Feud (1931) - John Walton
- The Deadline (1931) - Henry Evans
- Under Eighteen (1931) - Minister at Wedding (uncredited)
- Delicious (1931) - Judge (uncredited)
- Emma (1932) - Druggist at Trial (uncredited)
- Forbidden (1932) - Grover's Doctor (uncredited)
- One Man Law (1932) - Judge Cooper (uncredited)
- Tomorrow and Tomorrow (1932) - Professor Flynn (uncredited)
- Polly of the Circus (1932) - Dr. Brownell (uncredited)
- South of the Rio Grande (1932) - Mayor (uncredited)
- The Wet Parade (1932) - Southerner (uncredited)
- High Speed (1932) - Police Captain Blaine
- Destry Rides Again (1932) - Mr. Dangerfield
- Letty Lynton (1932) - Dr. Sanders (uncredited)
- Strangers of the Evening (1932) - Policeman (uncredited)
- Radio Patrol (1932) - Police Academy Commander (uncredited)
- Street of Women (1932) - Minister at Wedding (uncredited)
- Daring Danger (1932) - First Ranch Owner
- The Texas Bad Man (1932) - Chester Bigelow - Banker
- The Washington Masquerade (1932) - Senator Haley (uncredited)
- Drifting Souls (1932) - Doctor
- Horse Feathers (1932) - Professor in Wagstaff's Study (uncredited)
- The Last Man (1932) - Captain of the Glencoe
- Two Against the World (1932) - Judge (uncredited)
- Thirteen Women (1932) - Chief of Detectives (uncredited)
- The Night of June 13 (1932) - Mr. Henry Morrow (uncredited)
- The Phantom President (1932) - Convention Chairman (uncredited)
- Breach of Promise (1932) - Judge
- Virtue (1932) - Judge (uncredited)
- Hidden Gold (1932) - The Chief (uncredited)
- I Am a Fugitive from a Chain Gang (1932) - Chamber of Commerce Chairman (uncredited)
- Speed Demon (1932) - Judge
- Prosperity (1932) - Train Conductor (uncredited)
- If I Had a Million (1932) - Mr. Brown (uncredited)
- Tess of the Storm Country (1932) - Judge (uncredited)
- No More Orchids (1932) - Captain Jeffries (uncredited)
- The Sign of the Cross (1932) - Enthusiastic Spectator (uncredited)
- Central Park (1932) - Police Commissioner (uncredited)
- Child of Manhattan (1933) - Dr. Schultz
- Treason (1933) - Judge Randall
- Smoke Lightning (1933) - Judge Cooper (uncredited)
- King of the Jungle (1933) - Policeman (uncredited)
- Gabriel Over the White House (1933) - Chief Justice of the United States (uncredited)
- The Cohens and Kellys in Trouble (1933) - Freighter Captain (uncredited)
- The Working Man (1933) - Reeves Company Board Member (uncredited)
- The Thrill Hunter (1933) - Ed Jackson
- Unknown Valley (1933) - Jim Bridger (uncredited)
- Man Hunt (1933) - Henry Woodward aka Barrows
- Tomorrow at Seven (1933) - Coroner
- Jennie Gerhardt (1933) - Lester's Doctor (uncredited)
- The Silk Express (1933) - Mill Owner in Association (uncredited)
- The Man Who Dared (1933) - Miami Yachtsman (uncredited)
- I Love That Man (1933) - Prison Warden (uncredited)
- The Wrecker (1933) - Doctor
- Baby Face (1933) - Bank Director (uncredited)
- The Power and the Glory (1933) - Doctor (uncredited)
- Deluge (1933) - Townsman (uncredited)
- The Last Trail (1933) - Judge Wilson
- Lady for a Day (1933) - Police Capt. Moore (uncredited)
- Torch Singer (1933) - Doctor (uncredited)
- Brief Moment (1933) - Higgins - Office Manager
- Broken Dreams (1933) - Judge Harvey E. Blake
- Hold the Press (1933) - Judge O'Neill
- Duck Soup (1933) - Secretary of Labor (uncredited)
- The Right to Romance (1933) - Doctor at Hospital (uncredited)
- Before Midnight (1933) - Harry Graham (uncredited)
- The Big Shakedown (1934) - Fillmore - Board Member (uncredited)
- Frontier Marshal (1934) - Judge Walters
- This Side of Heaven (1934) - Rev. J.A. Hayes (uncredited)
- The Quitter (1934) - Travers
- Gambling Lady (1934) - Sheila's Attorney (uncredited)
- The House of Rothschild (1934) - Master of Ceremonies (uncredited)
- George White's Scandals (1934) - Judge O'Neill
- The Lost Jungle (1934) - Capt. Robinson
- School for Girls (1934) - Judge
- Once to Every Woman (1934) - Priest
- You're Telling Me! (1934) - Conductor (uncredited)
- Upper World (1934) - Henshaw (scenes deleted)
- Sadie McKee (1934) - Brennan's Second Doctor (uncredited)
- Hell Bent for Love (1934) - Judge
- Girl in Danger (1934) - Judge (uncredited)
- Green Eyes (1934) - Banker (uncredited)
- A Man's Game (1934) - Judge
- Madame Du Barry (1934) - Doctor (uncredited)
- She Learned About Sailors (1934) - Justice of the Peace (uncredited)
- The Old Fashioned Way (1934) - Train Conductor (uncredited)
- Chained (1934) - S.S. Official (uncredited)
- Take the Stand (1934) - Judge (uncredited)
- Girl in Danger (1934) - Chief of Police O'Brien
- The Lemon Drop Kid (1934) - Doctor
- A Lost Lady (1934) - Mr. Cannon (uncredited)
- The Curtain Falls (1934) - Minor Role (uncredited)
- Student Tour (1934) - Old Graduate (uncredited)
- Tomorrow's Youth (1934) - Judge
- I'll Fix It (1934) - Chairman (uncredited)
- The President Vanishes (1934) - Cabinet Member (uncredited)
- Jealousy (1934) - Hospital Doctor (uncredited)
- Flirting with Danger (1934) - American Consul in San Rico (uncredited)
- The Westerner (1934) - Zach Addison
- Fugitive Lady (1934) - Judge (uncredited)
- The Gay Bride (1934) - Justice of the Peace (uncredited)
- Sons of Steel (1934) - Mr. Herman
- The Band Plays On (1934) - Doctor (uncredited)
- White Lies (1934) - Judge (uncredited)
- Unknown Woman (1935)
- Fighting Shadows (1935)
- Justice of the Range (1935)
- Riding Wild (1935)
- Tomorrow's Youth (1935)
- In Spite of Danger (1935)
- On Probation (1935)
- End of the Trail (1936)
- Half Shot Shooters (1936) - Major Smith
- Disorder in the Court (1936) - Judge (uncredited)
- Reefer Madness (1936) - Judge (uncredited)
- The Oregon Trail (1936)
- Counterfeit Lady (1936)
- Code of the Range (1936)
- The Drag-Net (1936)
- Modern Times (1936) - Sheriff Couler
- Killer at Large (1936)
- Shakedown (1936)
- Racketeers in Exile (1937)
- Two Gun Law (1937)
- Trapped (1937)
- Outlaws of the Prairie (1937)
- The Adventures of Tom Sawyer (1938) - Coroner on Trial (uncredited)
- The Gladiator (1938)
- West of Cheyenne (1938)
- The Main Event (1938)
- Call of the Rockies (1938)
- Law of the Plains (1938)
- Squadron of Honor (1938)
- The Colorado Trail (1938)
- Lincoln in the White House (1939)
- Jesse James (1939)
- The Stranger from Texas (1939)
- Arizona Legion (1939)
- Fugitive at Large (1939)
- The Thundering West (1939)

=== As director ===
- Jim's Atonement (1912)
- His Father's Rifle (1914)
- Lord John's Journal (1915)
- Lord John in New York (1915)
- The Grey Sisterhood (1916)
- Three Fingered Jenny (1916)
- The League of the Future (1916)
- The Soul of Kura San (1916)
- The Three Godfathers (1916)
- The Jackals of a Great City (1916)
- Cupid's Round Up (1916)
- Fighting Mad (1917)
- The Wolf and His Mate (1918)
- Painted Lips (1918)
- Nobody's Wife (1918)
- The Feud (1919)
- The Mother of His Children (1920)
- The Girl of My Heart (1920)
- Two Moons (1920)
- The Sleepwalker (1922)
- Only a Shop Girl (1922)
- More to Be Pitied Than Scorned (1923)
- Yesterday's Wife (1923)
- Temptation (1923)
- The Marriage Market (1923)
- Discontented Husbands (1924)
- Three Keys (1925)
- The Love Gamble (1925)
- Speed (1925)
- The Unwritten Law (1925)
- Brooding Eyes (1926)
- The Millionaire Policeman (1926)
