= The Demon (1918 film) =

1918 silent film directed by George D. Baker

- Directed by: George D. Baker
- Written by: George D. Baker
- Based on: the novel, The Demon by: Alice Muriel Williamson; Charles Norris Williamson
- Starring: Edith Storey; Lewis Cody; Charles K. Gerrard
- Cinematography: William C. Thompson
- Production company: Metro Pictures
- Release date: July 22, 1918 (US)
- Running time: 5 reels
- Country: United States
- Language: English

The Demon is a 1918 American silent comedy film, directed by George D. Baker. It stars Edith Storey, Lewis Cody, and Charles K. Gerrard, and was released on July 22, 1918.

== Cast ==
- Edith Storey as Princess Perdita
- Lewis Cody as Jim Lassells
- Charles K. Gerrard as Tom Reardon
- Virginia Chester as Lady Lilah Grey
- Mollie McConnell as The Duchess of Westgate
- Laura Winston as Aissa
- Fred Malatesta as Count Theodore de Seramo
- Frank Deshon as Prince Lorenzo di Rivoli
- Alice Knowland as Señorita Selina Rossi
- Anne Schaefer as Señorita Agatha Rossi

== Reception ==
Exhibitors Herald gave the film a positive review. While they felt the plot was not as well-done as it might have been, it was good enough to develop into an "interesting production", for which most viewers would "come away with a lighter feeling and a greater admiration for Miss Storey." They praised Storey's performance. Motion Picture News also enjoyed the picture, stating, "The production is in five reels and there is actionable drama every foot of the reelage."
