= Jewel (1915 film) =

1915 film by Lois Weber, Phillips Smalley

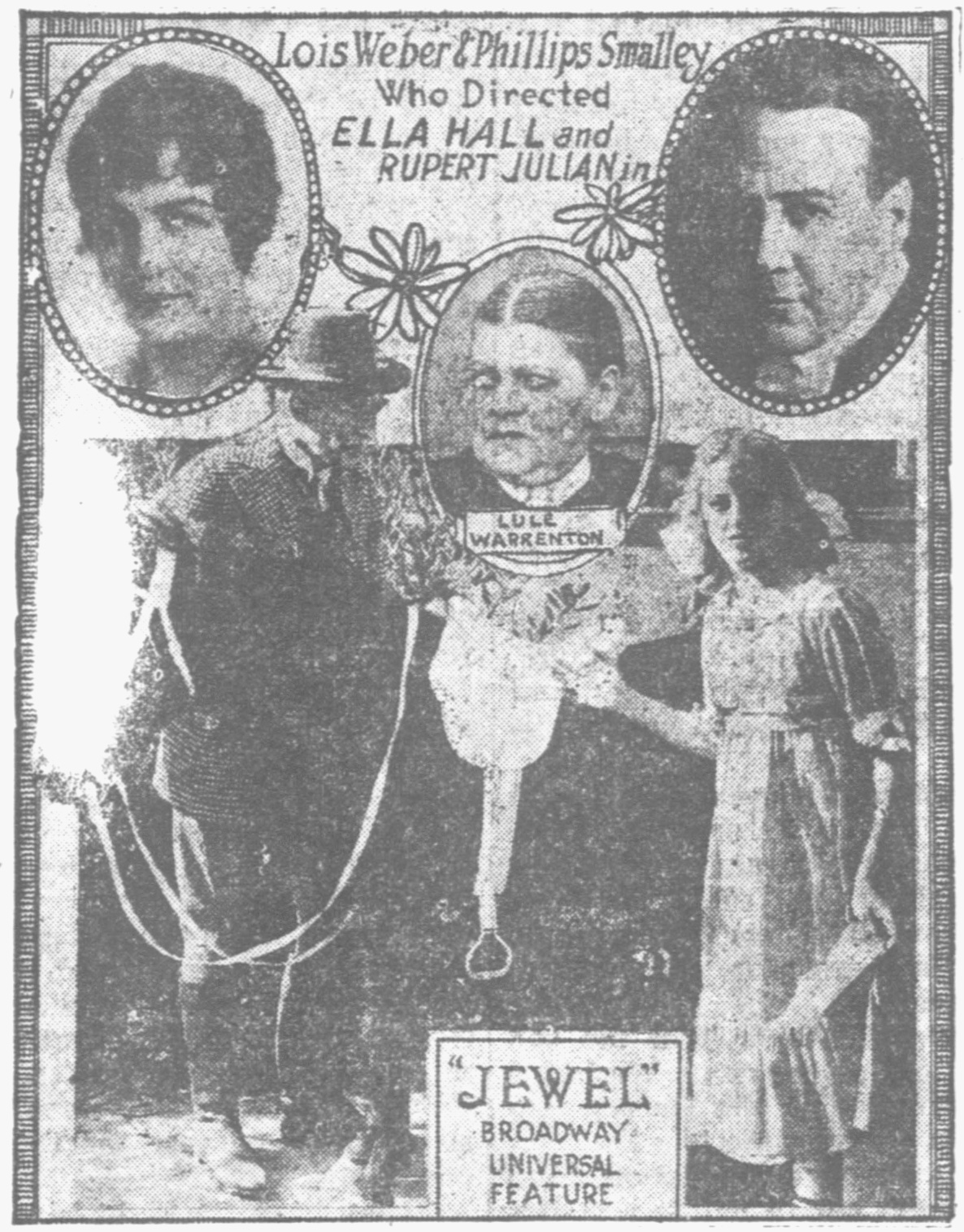
- Contemporary publicity
- Directed by: Phillips Smalley
- Written by: Lois Weber
- Based on: Jewel: A Chapter in Her Life by Clara Louise Burnham
- Produced by: Phillips Smalley; Lois Weber
- Starring: Ella Hall; Rupert Julian; Frank Elliott
- Production company: Universal Film Manufacturing Company
- Distributed by: Universal Film Manufacturing Company
- Release date: August 30, 1915
- Running time: 50 minutes
- Country: United States
- Languages: Silent; English intertitles

Jewel is a 1915 American silent drama film directed by Phillips Smalley and starring Ella Hall, Rupert Julian and Frank Elliott.

== Plot ==
Widowed and penniless, Mrs. Evringham moves in with her father-in-law, a rich man with a sad and irritable character. Her plans are to marry her daughter Eloise to the rich Dr. Ballard. One day, the gruff owner of the house receives a letter from his other son, Harry, who announces that he and his wife are leaving for a business trip to Europe and asks him to host their daughter Jewel during that time.

Faced with the contrary opinion of his daughter-in-law, Mr. Evringham decides instead to accept hosting his granddaughter. When the girl arrives, she is greeted coldly and treated in a formal and rigid manner by the inflexible housekeeper, Mrs. Forbes. Soon, however, Jewel's cheerful nature begins to melt the icy barrier that separates her from the rest of the family. Through her faith in Christian Science, Jewel cures herself of a fever, softens and converts her grandfather, re-educates her cousin and aunt, and persuades Mrs. Forbes' son to stop drinking. Through his efforts, the "castle of discord" is transformed into a "castle of contentment".

== Cast ==
- Ella Hall as Jewel
- Rupert Julian as Mr. Evringham
- Frank Elliott as Lawrence Evringham
- Hylda Hollis as Mrs. Lawrence Evringham
- Brownie Brownell as Eliose
- T.D. Crittenden as Harry Evringham
- Dixie Carr as Julia
- Gibson Gowland as Dr. Ballard
- Abe Mundon as Zeke
- Jack Holt as Nat Bonnell
- Lule Warrenton as Mrs. Forbes

== Bibliography ==
- Goble, Alan. The Complete Index to Literary Sources in Film. Walter de Gruyter, 1999.
