= The Lion's Mouse =

1923 film

- Directed by: Oscar Apfel
- Written by: A. M. Williamson (novel); C. N. Williamson (novel)
- Release date: May 1923
- Countries: United Kingdom; Netherlands
- Language: Silent

The Lion's Mouse (Dutch: De leeuw en de muis) is a 1923 British-Dutch silent crime film directed by Oscar Apfel.

== Cast ==
- Wyndham Standing as Dick Sands
- Mary Odette as Mouse
- Rex Davis as Justin O'Reilly
- Marguerite Marsh as Olga Beverley
- Carl Tobi as Stephen
- Greta Lobo-Braakensiek as murderer
- Willem van der Veer
- Roy Travers
- Cor Smits
