= Stella LeSaint =

American actress

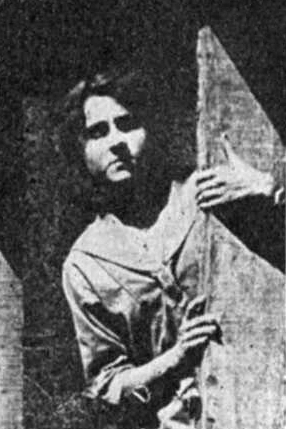
- In The Woman of The Mountains (1913)
- Born: Stella Razeto; December 17, 1881; San Diego, California, U.S.
- Died: September 21, 1948 (aged 66); Malibu, California, U.S.
- Spouse: Edward LeSaint (December 25, 1913 – September 10, 1940; his death)

Stella LeSaint (née Razeto; (Note: Spelled "Razetto" in some sources.) December 17, 1881 – September 21, 1948) was an American silent film actress.

== Career ==
Born in San Diego, California, LeSaint worked as a stage actress and in vaudeville, founding Stella Razeto and Company in New York City. She left stage acting because of illness.

LeSaint began acting in films in 1913. She worked with the Selig Polyscope Company but left in 1916 to join the Universal Company. She starred with William Garwood in films such as Lord John in New York.

In 1917, LeSaint left films to return to the stage, but by 1935, she had returned to films, acting mostly in uncredited bit parts.

== Personal life ==
She married Edward LeSaint on December 25, 1913, and remained with him until his death on September 10, 1940. She died on September 21, 1948, in Malibu, California, and is buried in Hollywood Forever Cemetery.

Although she took Le Saint as her married name, "she kept Razetto/Razeto for all professional dealings".

== Partial filmography ==
Film
Year	Title	Role	Notes
1914	His Father's Rifle		
1915	Lord John in New York	Maida Odell	Ep. 1 of Lord John's Journal
1916	The Jackals of a Great City		as Stella Razeto
1916	The Three Godfathers	Ruby Merrill	as Stella Razeto
1916	The Grey Sisterhood	Maida Odell	Ep. 2 of Lord John's Journal
1916	Three Fingered Jenny	Maida Odell	Ep. 3 of Lord John's Journal
1916	The Eye of Horus	Maida Odell	Ep. 4 of Lord John's Journal
1916	The League of the Future	Maida Odell	Ep. 5 of Lord John's Journal
