= My Friend the Chauffeur =

1926 film directed by Erich Waschneck

- Directed by: Erich Waschneck
- Written by: Hans Behrendt; Erich Waschneck; Alice Muriel Williamson (novel My Friend the Chauffeur); Charles Norris Williamson (novel My Friend the Chauffeur)
- Produced by: Erich Pommer
- Starring: Hans Albers; Ferdinand von Alten; Barbara von Annenkoff
- Cinematography: Friedl Behn-Grund
- Music by: Willy Schmidt-Gentner
- Production company: UFA
- Distributed by: UFA
- Release date: 1 January 1926
- Country: Germany
- Languages: Silent; German intertitles

My Friend the Chauffeur (German: Mein Freund der Chauffeur) is a 1926 German silent comedy film directed by Erich Waschneck and starring Hans Albers, Ferdinand von Alten and Barbara von Annenkoff.

It was made by Germany's largest studio UFA. The film's sets were designed by the art directors Botho Hoefer, Carl Ludwig Kirmse and Bernhard Schwidewski.

== Cast ==
In alphabetical order

- Hans Albers as Sir Ralph Moray
- Alice Kempen as Bietsche, Frau Kidders Tochter
- Oskar Marion as Lord Terry Barrymore
- Olly Orska as Maida, Frau Kidders Nichte
- Livio Pavanelli as Fürst Coramini
- Ferdinand von Alten as Graf Dalmar-Kalm
- Barbara von Annenkoff as Frau Stanley Kidder
- Alfred von Schluga as Joseph, der Chauffeur

== Bibliography ==
- Hardt, Urusula. From Caligari to California: Erich Pommer's Life in the International Film Wars. Berghahn Books, 1996.
