= Tomorrow's Youth =

1934 film by Charles Lamont

- Directed by: Charles Lamont
- Written by: Robert Meller (screenplay); Harry Sauber (story); Gene Whitney (screenplay)
- Produced by: Ben Verschleiser
- Starring: See below
- Cinematography: Jack MacKenzie
- Edited by: Carl Pierson
- Distributed by: Monogram Pictures
- Release date: October 15, 1934
- Running time: 63 minutes
- Country: United States
- Language: English

Tomorrow's Youth is a 1934 American film directed by Charles Lamont.

== Cast ==
- Dickie Moore as Thomas Hall Jr
- Martha Sleeper as Mrs. Hall
- John Miljan as Tom Hall
- Franklin Pangborn as Tutor
- Paul Hurst as Detective
- Gloria Shea as Janes Holsworth
- Jane Darwell as Mary
- Barbara Bedford as Miss Booth
- Harry C. Bradley as School Principal
- Niles Welch as Attorney
- Edward LeSaint as Judge
