= The Midnight Man (1917 film) =

1917 film directed by Elmer Clifton

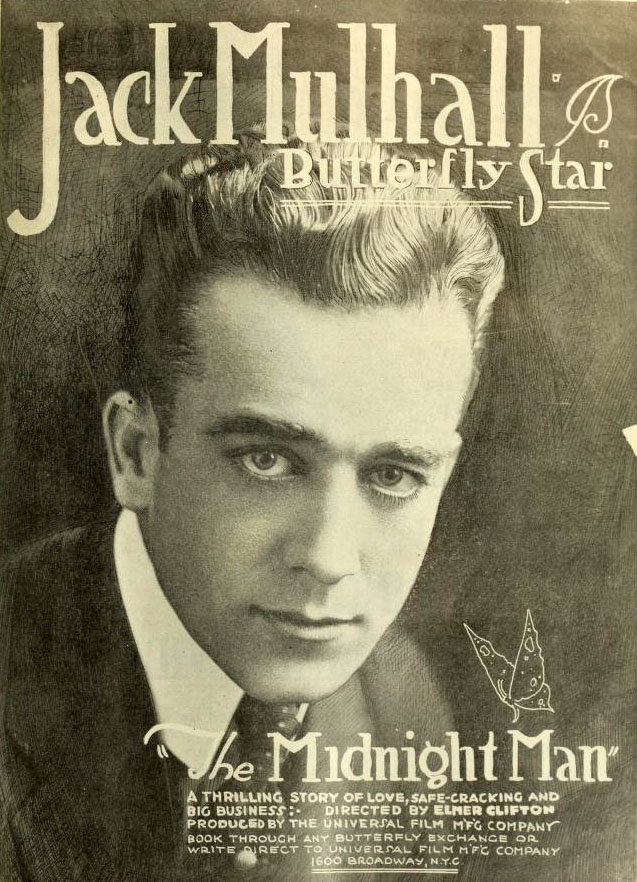
- Advertisement for the film
- Directed by: Elmer Clifton
- Written by: Tom Gibson
- Story by: Bess Meredyth
- Production company: Universal Film Manufacturing Company
- Distributed by: Universal Film Manufacturing Company
- Release date: August 13, 1917 (U.S.)
- Country: United States

The Midnight Man is a 1917 American crime drama silent black and white film directed by Elmer Clifton and written by Tom Gibson. It is based on the story of Bess Meredyth.

== Cast ==
- Jack Mulhall as Bob Moore
- Ann Kroman as Irene Hardin
- Al MacQuarrie as The 'Eel'
- Warda Lamont as Molly
- Hal Wilson as Mr. Moore
- Wilbur Higby as John Hardin
- Jack Carlyle
