= The Grey Sisterhood =

1916 short film by Edward LeSaint

- Directed by: Edward J. Le Saint
- Written by: Harvey Gates (Scenario)
- Starring: William Garwood; Ogden Crane; Doc Crane; Stella Razeto; Laura Oakley; Carmen Phillips; Albert MacQuarrie
- Distributed by: Universal Film Manufacturing Company
- Release date: January 4, 1916
- Running time: 3 reels
- Country: United States
- Languages: Silent film English intertitles

The Grey Sisterhood is a 1916 American silent short mystery directed by Edward LeSaint. Starring William Garwood in the lead role, it was the second film in the five film series Lord John's Journal.

== Cast ==
- William Garwood as Lord John
- Stella Razetto as Maida Odell
- Ogden Crane as Roger Odell
- Carmen Phillips
- Doc Crane as L.J. Calit
- Laura Oakley as Head Sister
- Albert MacQuarrie

== See also ==
- Lord John in New York (1915)
- Three Fingered Jenny (1916)
- The Eye of Horus (1916)
- The League of the Future (1916)
