= Sally Scraggs, Housemaid =

- Directed by: Robert Z. Leonard
- Starring: Robert Z. Leonard]] Margarita Fischer; Laura Oakley
- Production company: Universal Pictures
- Distributed by: Universal Pictures
- Release date: August 14, 1913
- Running time: 1 reel
- Country: United States
- Languages: Silent; English intertitles

Sally Scraggs, Housemaid is a 1913 American silent short comedy film directed by Robert Z. Leonard and starring Leonard, Margarita Fischer and Laura Oakley. In order to find material for her next work, a novelist pretends to be a housemaid and gains employment in a boarding house.

== Cast ==
- Robert Z. Leonard as Frank Norcross
- Margarita Fischer as Doris Lowrey / Sally Scraggs
- Laura Oakley as Mrs. Shackleton
- 'Snub' Pollard as Butler

== Bibliography ==
- Massa, Steve. Slapstick Divas: The Women of Silent Comedy. BearManor Media, 2017.
