= Sarah Mundell Crane =

American opera singer

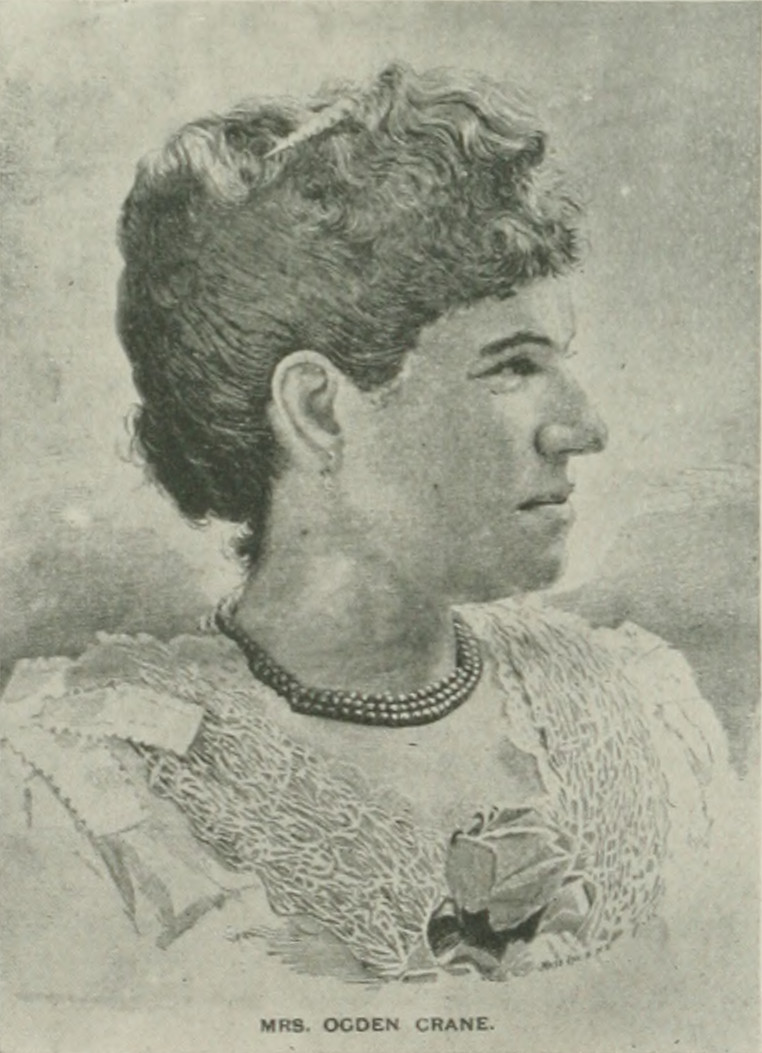
Mrs. Ogden Crane

Sarah Mundell Crane (1855 – January 4, 1914) known professionally as Mrs. A. Ogden Crane, was an American concert singer and musical educator. She toured with her three sisters and niece, who were known as the Mundell or Amphlon Quartet, and later became a successful music instructor.

== Early life ==
Sarah E. Mundell was born in Brooklyn, New York, in 1855, to Alfred Mundell and Sarah A. Robert. The family house was at 77 New York Avenue, Brooklyn. The Mundells had five daughters other than Sarah: Mrs G. F. Underhill, Lavinia A. Sutcliffe (b. 1860), Martha Louise (b. 1862), Isabelle F. (b. 1865) and Ida May (b. 1858). They had also one son, Willie P. (b. 1866). On April 20, 1896, the Mundells celebrated their 50th anniversary with a party worthy of notice in local newspapers.

She received her musical education in New York, her own mother had a fine voice and was for many years a soloist in a prominent church in Brooklyn. She studied for six years under Antonio Barilli and for five years under William Courtney.

== Career ==
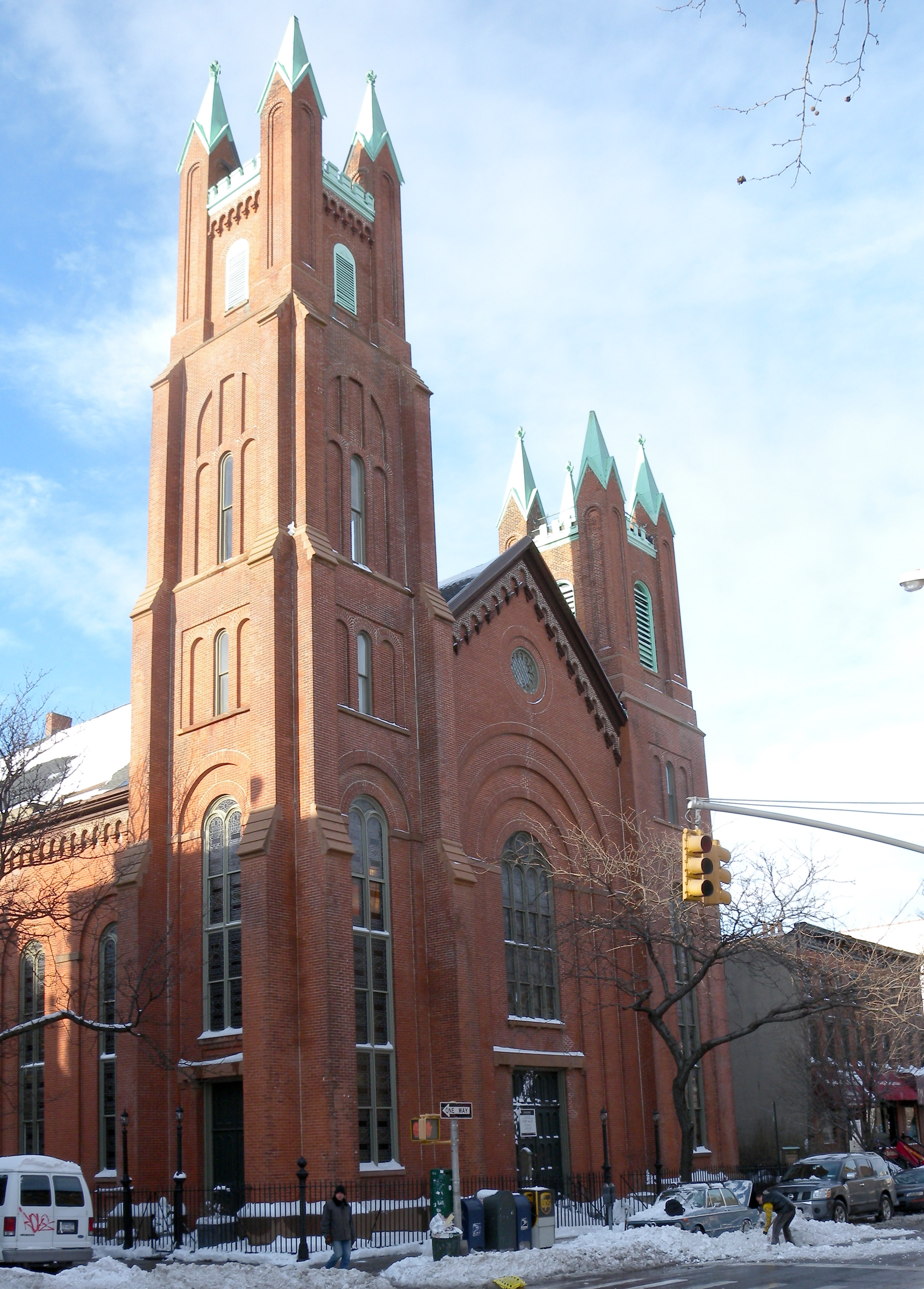
South Congregational Church, Brooklyn

Mrs. Ogden Crane adopted the pure Italian method and Style of singing. Her voice was a dramatic soprano of wide range. She was a member of the choirs in the South Congregational Church, Brooklyn, in St. Ann Church, the Church of the Puritans and St. James's Methodist Episcopal Church, New York.

She was well known on the concert stage, having traveled over nearly every state in the union, and in 1890 made a tour through the South with her three sisters and niece, who were known as the Mundell or Amphlon Quartet: M. Louise Mundell, Lavinia A. Sutcliffe, Isabel Mundell and Juliet Underhill. M. Louise and Isabelle F. never married and lived for all their life in Brooklyn.

Her repertory of oratorios and standard concert pieces was large, and she won an enviable reputation. As an instructor she had a large number of pupils, both professional and amateur, from all parts of the country.

In 1894 she performed Columbia at the dedication of the newly built City Hall in Bayonne, New Jersey. In April 1894 her pupils gave the operetta Coronation of the Rose, under Mrs. Crane's direction, at Hardman Hall, New York. In 1896 she performed in The Doctor of Alcantara: Opera Bouffe in Two Acts.

== Personal life ==
Crane lived at the Carnegie Hall Apartments, Manhattan, where she had a music studio on the 11th floor for 15 years. Previously she had a vocal studio and private concert-room at 3 East 14th Street. She had one son, Harry Ogden Crane (September 1, 1873, Brooklyn, New York – May 14, 1940 in Hollywood, California), a minor silent film actor mostly known for his appearance in The Lost Freight Car (1911), The Grey Sisterhood (1916) and Her Five-Foot Highness (1920); Harry Ogden Crane married Grace Benham (June 25, 1876, Kansas – November 19, 1968, Pasadena, California), a silent film actress.

She died suddenly on January 4, 1914, while visiting a friend, Marie Birdslee, at the Van Courtlandt Hotel, 142 West 49th Street.
