= Hickory Hiram =

1918 film

- Directed by: Edwin Frazee
- Written by: Edwin Frazee
- Produced by: Carl Laemmle
- Starring: Stan Laurel
- Production company: Nestor Film Company
- Distributed by: Universal Film Manufacturing Company
- Release date: April 8, 1918
- Running time: 1 reel
- Country: United States
- Language: Silent (English intertitles)

Hickory Hiram is a 1918 American silent comedy film featuring Stan Laurel. It is not known whether the film currently survives.

== Cast ==
- Stan Laurel as Hiram
- Teddy Sampson as Trixie
- Neal Burns as Neal
- Bartine Burkett

== Reception ==
Like many American films of the time, Hickory Hiram was subject to cuts by city and state film censorship boards. For example, the Chicago Board of Censors cut all scenes of man in underwear after the screen title and the fat man bumping other man with stomach.

== See also ==
- List of American films of 1918
