= Phoney Photos =

1918 film

- Directed by: Edwin Frazee
- Written by: Edwin Frazee
- Produced by: Carl Laemmle; Henry Lehrman
- Starring: Stan Laurel
- Release date: July 3, 1918
- Country: United States
- Languages: Silent film English intertitles

Phoney Photos is a 1918 American silent comedy film featuring Stan Laurel.

== Plot ==
This plot summary comes from the original copyright filing at the Library of Congress:

Grace is at the wagon of a fruit vendor and writes a note telling the buyer to communicate with her. The note is seen by Jules, who sends a letter to Grace. The note eventually falls into the hands of Swift. Swift also communicates with Grace. Jules calls on Grace and takes her out driving. The car is overturned and Swift rescues her.

Swift learns she is the girl who wrote the note. Grouch and his wife are determined that Grace shall marry Jules. They lock Grace in her room and forbid Swift from the house. Swift is on the alert and communicates with Grace by talking through a water pipe with Grace. Swift arranges an elopement with Grace. Mrs. Grouch learns of the proposed elopement and plans to checkmate Swift. She induces the [word deleted] servant to masquerade as Grace. The [word deleted] servant, heavily veiled, goes forth to meet Swift under instructions from Mrs. Grouch. Jules meets the [word deleted] girl and, under the impression she is Grace, takes her to the minister. Swift finds Grace and hurries with her to the office of a Justice of the Peace, where they are married.

Mrs. Grouch thinking Swift has married the [word deleted] servant, is elated. It is all explained, however, when the [word deleted] woman removes her veil and Jules and Mrs. Grouch discover that their plans have gone astray.

— Edwin Frazee, story and scenario

== Cast ==
- Stan Laurel
- Walter Belasco
- Neal Burns
- Rena Rogers
- Lydia Yeamans Titus

== See also ==
- List of American films of 1918
