= The Man Without a Face (1928 serial) =

1928 film

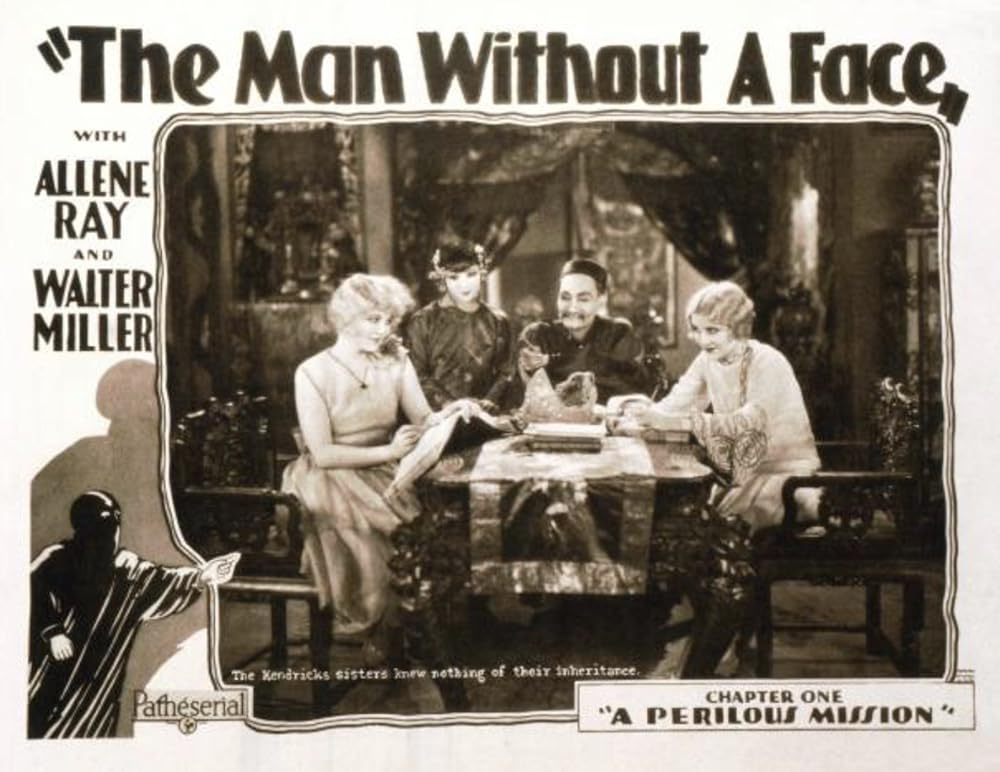
- Directed by: Spencer Gordon Bennet
- Written by: Joseph Anthony Roach; Alice M. Williamson; C.N. Williamson
- Starring: Allene Ray; Walter Miller
- Distributed by: Pathé Exchange
- Release date: January 15, 1928
- Running time: 10 episodes
- Country: United States
- Language: Silent with English intertitles

The Man Without a Face is a 1928 American adventure film serial directed by Spencer Gordon Bennet. The film is now considered to be lost.

== Cast ==
- Allene Ray
- Walter Miller
- E. H. Calvert
- Sōjin Kamiyama
- Gladden James
- Richard Neill (credited as Richard R. Neill)
- Toshia Mori (credited as Toshiye Ichioka)
- Richard Travers (credited as Richard C. Travers)

== See also ==
- List of film serials
- List of film serials by studio
