= Alien Souls =

1916 lost silent film directed by Frank Reicher

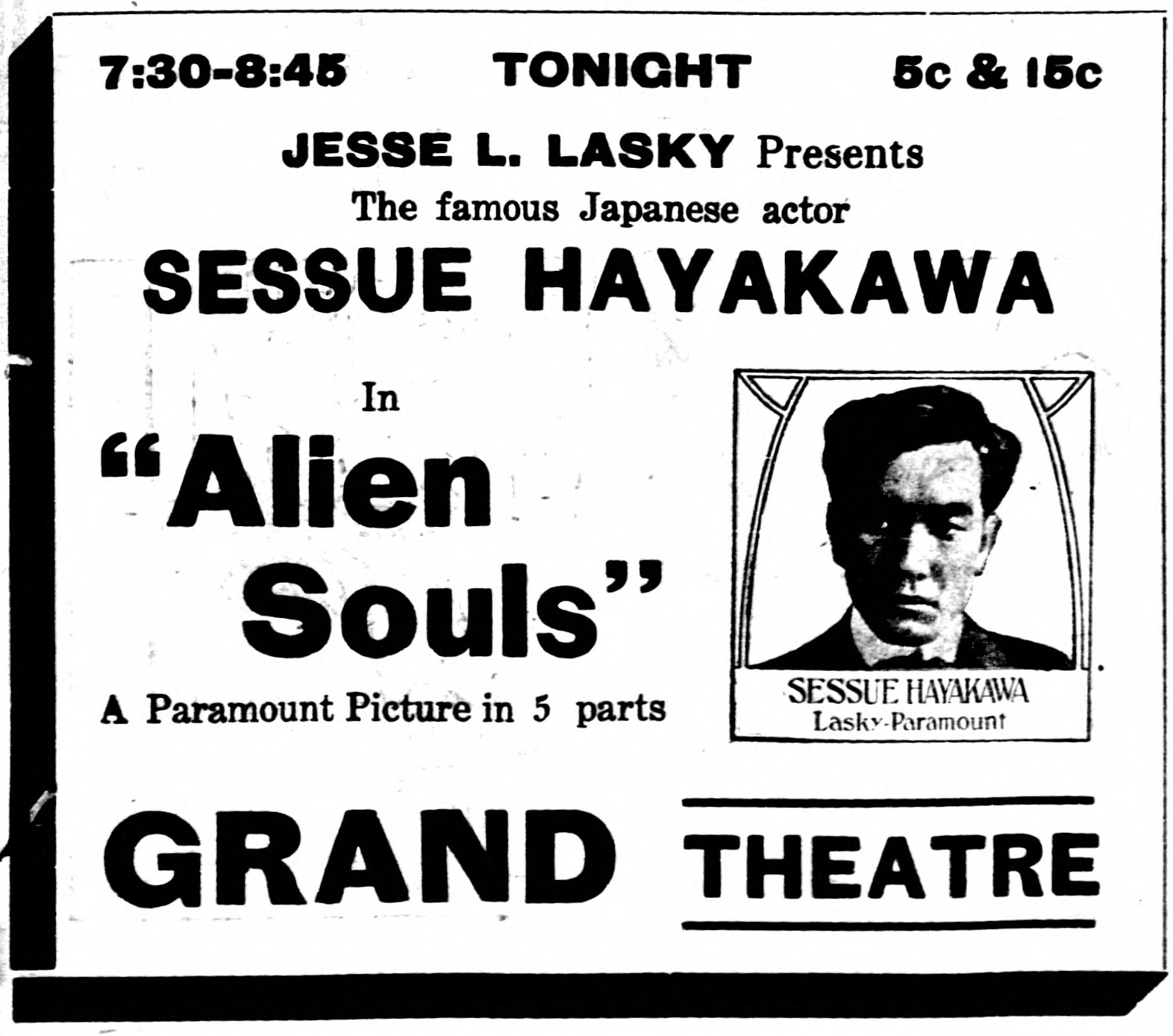
- Newspaper advertisement
- Directed by: Frank Reicher
- Story by: Margaret Turnbull; Hector Turnbull
- Produced by: Jesse Lasky
- Starring: Sessue Hayakawa; Tsuru Aoki
- Cinematography: Walter Stradling
- Distributed by: Paramount Pictures
- Release date: May 11, 1916
- Running time: 5 reels
- Country: USA
- Language: Silent film (English intertitles)

Alien Souls is a lost 1916 American silent drama film directed by Frank Reicher and starring Sessue Hayakawa, his real-life wife Tsuru Aoki and Earle Foxe. It was developed as a vehicle for Hayakawa after the success of his film The Cheat.

== Cast ==
- Sessue Hayakawa - Sakata
- Tsuru Aoki - Yuri Chan
- Earle Foxe - Aleck Lindsay
- Grace Benham - Mrs. Conway
- J. Parks Jones - Jack Holloway
- Violet Malone - Gertrude Van Ness
- Dorothy Abril - Geraldine Smythe

== Preservation ==
With no prints of Alien Souls located in any film archives, it is considered a lost film.
