= Prince or Clown =

1928 film

- Directed by: Aleksandr Razumny
- Written by: Maurice Dekobra (novel); Franz Schulz
- Produced by: Willy Zeunert
- Starring: Marcella Albani; Barbara von Annenkoff; Iván Petrovich
- Cinematography: Günther Rittau
- Music by: Willy Schmidt-Gentner
- Production company: Phoebus Film
- Distributed by: Phoebus Film
- Release date: 6 January 1928
- Running time: 94 minutes
- Country: Germany
- Languages: Silent; German intertitles

Prince or Clown (German: Fürst oder Clown) is a 1928 German silent film directed by Aleksandr Razumny and starring Marcella Albani, Barbara von Annenkoff and Iván Petrovich.

== Cast ==
- Marcella Albani as Lydia
- Barbara von Annenkoff as Fürstin Endoxia
- Iván Petrovich as Lucien Tréma
- Ralph Arthur Roberts as Prinz Hektor
- Oskar Homolka as Zurube
- Hermann Picha as Saccabona
- Michael Mar as Ygdal
- Lilian Weiß as Midinette
- Sig Arno as Sapigneul

== Bibliography ==
- Bock, Hans-Michael & Bergfelder, Tim. The Concise CineGraph. Encyclopedia of German Cinema. Berghahn Books, 2009.
