= Barbara von Annenkoff =

Russian actress

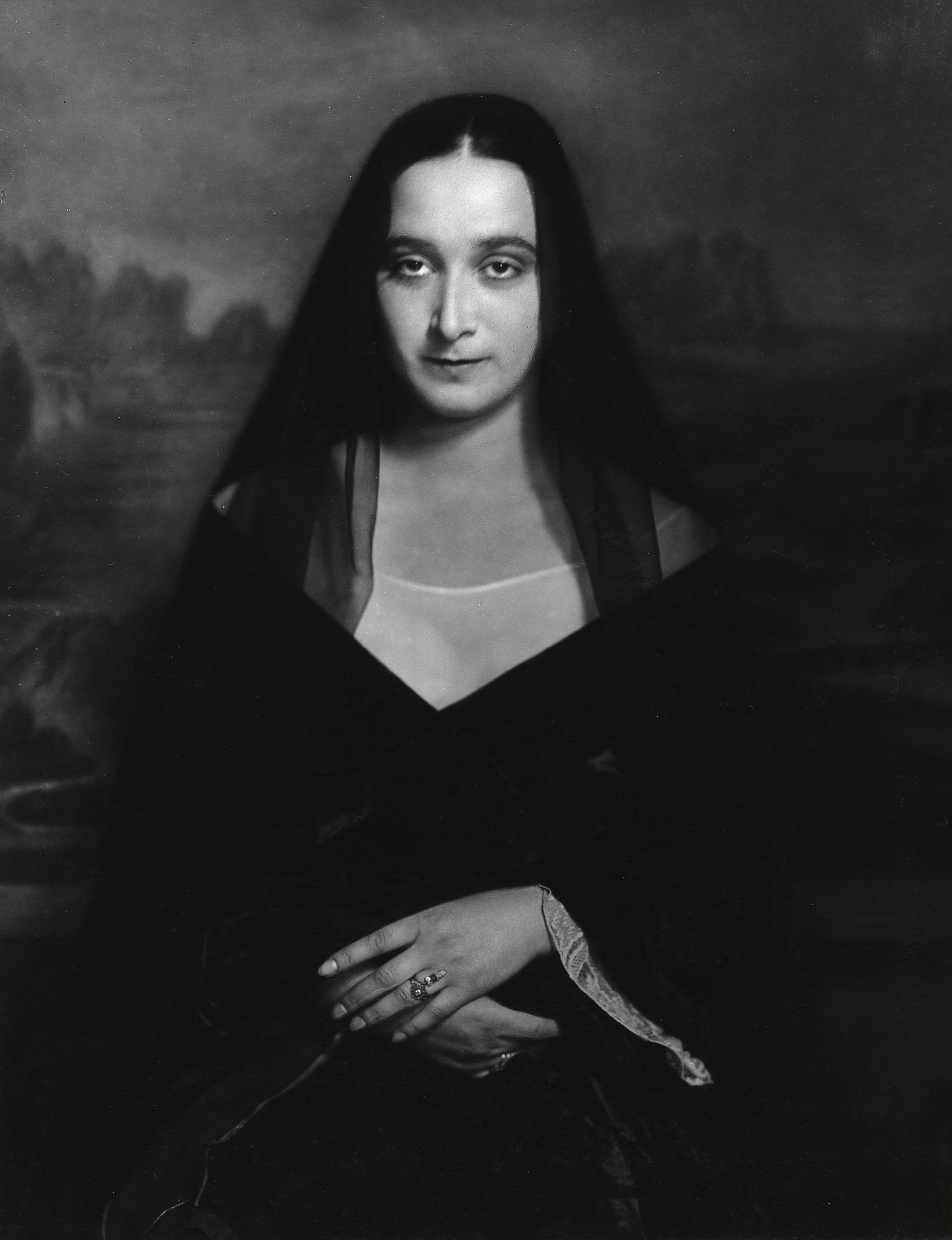
- Born: Varvara Annikova; Варвара Анненко́ва; 13 February 1900; St. Petersburg, Russian Empire
- Died: 30 November 1979 (aged 79); Baden-Baden, West Germany
- Occupation: Actress
- Years active: 1924–1941 (film)
- Relatives: Pavel Annenkov (grandfather)

Barbara von Annenkoff (13 February 1900 – 30 November 1979) was a Russian-born German stage and film actress.

== Selected filmography ==
- Op Hoop van Zegen (1924)
- Wood Love (1925)
- Den of Iniquity (1925)
- One Minute to Twelve (1925)
- Derby (1926)
- My Friend the Chauffeur (1926)
- Bismarck 1862–1898 (1927)
- The Awakening of Woman (1927)
- Prince or Clown (1928)
- Madame Bovary (1937)

== Bibliography ==
- Goble, Alan (1999). The Complete Index to Literary Sources in Film. Walter de Gruyter. ISBN 978-3-11-095194-3.
