= Neal Burns =

American actor (1892–1969)

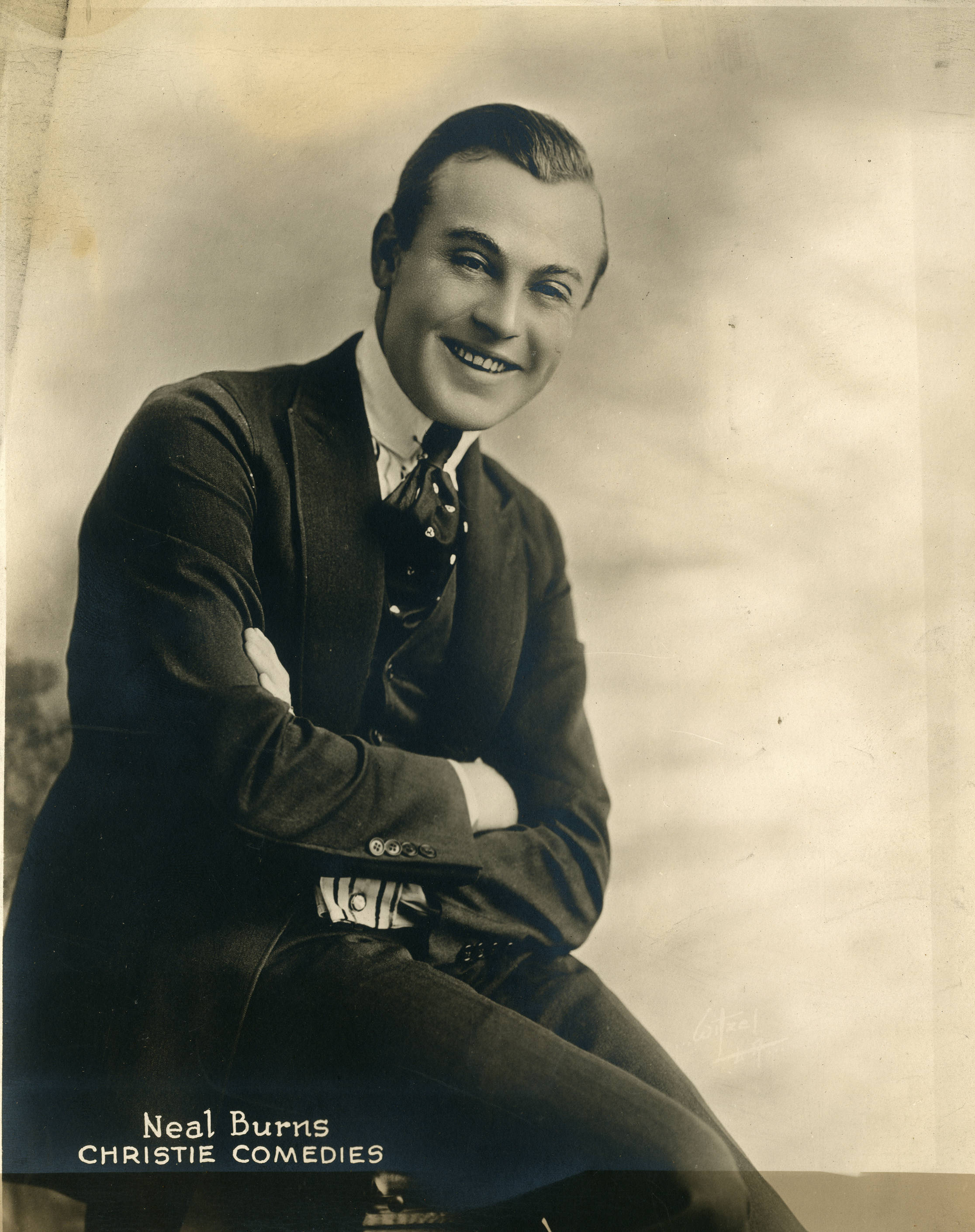
- Burns in 1923
- Born: June 26, 1892; Bristol, Pennsylvania, U.S.
- Died: October 3, 1969 (aged 77); Los Angeles, California, U.S.
- Occupations: Film actor; director; writer
- Years active: 1915–1946

Neal Burns (June 26, 1892 – October 3, 1969) was an American film actor, screenwriter, and director. He appeared in more than 200 films between 1915 and 1946.

Burns was born in Bristol, Pennsylvania and attended public schools in Atlantic City. He died in Los Angeles, California. He was the younger brother of fellow actor Eddie Barry.

Burns's work on stage included acting with the Gaiety Company at the Morosco Theater in Los Angeles in 1914.

In 1918, Burns was a drill sergeant in the Army at Camp Lewis.

== Selected filmography ==
- Operating on Cupid (1915)
- Their Friend, The Burglar (1915)
- Phoney Photos (1918)
- Hickory Hiram (1918)
- Mary's Ankle (1920)
- Divorce Made Easy (1929) (director)
- Sob Sister (1931)
- Kickin' the Crown Around (1933)
- Behold My Wife! (1934)
- The Face of Marble (1946)
