= He Comes Up Smiling =

1918 film by Allan Dwan

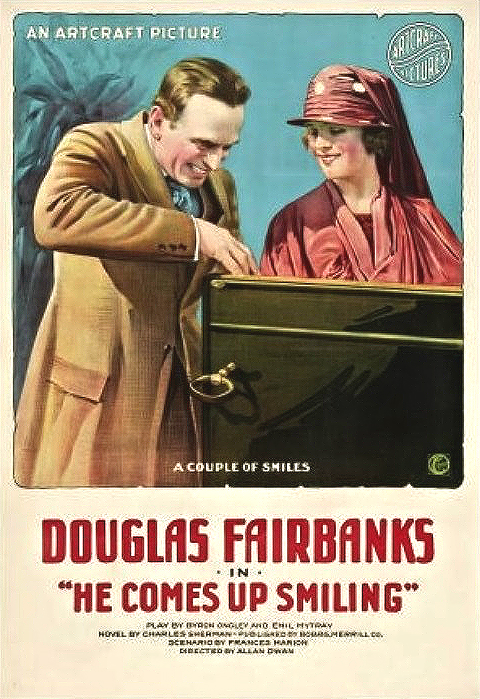
- Film poster
- Directed by: Allan Dwan
- Written by: Frances Marion; Theodore Reed (scenario editor)
- Based on: He Comes Up Smiling by Charles Sherman He Comes Up Smiling by Byron Ongley and Emil Nyitray
- Produced by: Douglas Fairbanks
- Starring: Douglas Fairbanks
- Cinematography: Joseph H. August; Hugh McClung
- Production company: Famous Players–Lasky/Artcraft
- Distributed by: Paramount Pictures
- Release date: September 8, 1918
- Running time: 5 reels (4,876 feet)
- Country: United States
- Language: Silent (English intertitles)

He Comes Up Smiling is a 1918 American comedy film produced by and starring Douglas Fairbanks and directed by Allan Dwan.

This film was based on a novel of the same title by Charles Sherman, which was adapted into a 1914 play of the same name by Byron Ongley and Emil Nyitray. Fairbanks starred in the play with Patricia Collinge as the female lead. This film "survives incomplete".

== Plot ==
As described in a film magazine, the principal duty of bank clerk Jerry Martin is to care for the bank president's pet canary. The bird escapes and Jerry starts in pursuit. In a chase that takes him far afield, Jerry meets a hobo and decides to give up his bank job. Baron Bean, another hobo, becomes his valet, but they desert Jerry when he is taking a bath and steal his clothes. He finds a suit belonging to William Batchelor, a broker who is cooling off at a pool, and with the broker's business cards he passes himself off as Batchelor. He meets John Bartlett and his daughter Billie and promptly falls in love. Her father is also a stock broker who has been nicked by Batchelor. An attempt is made to corner the market while Jerry is being entertained, but he foils the plotters, falls heir to a fortune, and wins the love of Billie.

== Cast ==
- Douglas Fairbanks as Jerry Martin
- Marjorie Daw as Billie Bartlett
- Herbert Standing as Mike
- Frank Campeau as John Bartlett
- Bull Montana as Baron Bean
- Albert MacQuarrie as William Batchelor
- Kathleen Kirkham as Louise
- Jay Dwiggins as General
- William Elmer
- Robert Cain

He Comes Up Smiling (1918)

== Preservation ==
The surviving reels of He Comes Up Smiling were preserved by the Academy Film Archive in 2010.
