= The Scarlet Runner =

1916 film

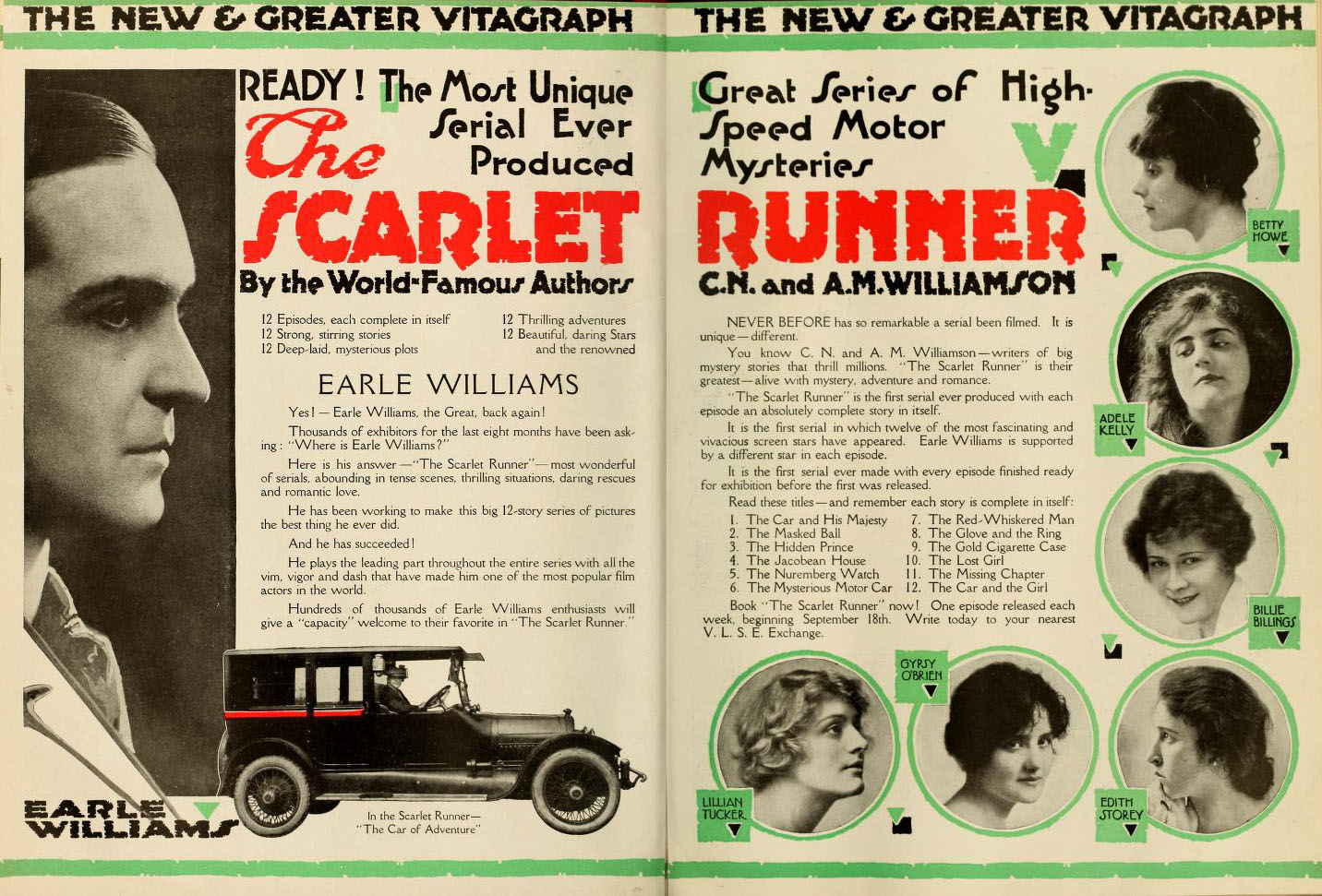
- Ad for the film
- Directed by: William P. S. Earle; Wally Van
- Written by: George H. Plympton; A. M. Williamson; C. N. Williamson
- Starring: Earle Williams; Marguerite Blake
- Distributed by: Vitagraph Company of America
- Release date: October 2, 1916
- Running time: 12 episodes
- Country: United States
- Language: Silent with English intertitles

The Scarlet Runner is a 1916 American drama film serial directed by William P. S. Earle and Wally Van. The film is considered lost.

== Plot ==
A series of 12 two-reel episodes, each a separate story related to the adventures of Christopher Race and his high-powered automobile, "The Scarlet Runner". Every episode has a different cast, except for the continuing role of Earle Williams.

== Cast ==
- Earle Williams as Christopher Race
- Marguerite Blake as Lady Ivy
- L. Rogers Lytton as Baron Von Hess
- Charles Kent as James Race
- Dorothy Kelly as Miss Collingwood
- Leila Blow as Mrs. Collingwood
- Donald Hall as Sir Gordon Race
- Lillian Tucker as Mrs. Dauray
- William R. Dunn as Fitzgerald
- Kalman Matus as Prince Mirco
- John Costello as Ambassador Rudovico
- Ethel Corcoran as Volda Rudovico
- Grace Valentine as Grace Norwood
- Zena Keefe as Sidney Chester / Dorothy Herbert
- Helen Pillsbury as The Mother
- Walter McGrail as Morley Chester
- Raymond Walburn as John Brown
- Gypsy O'Brien as Violet Hardcastle
- Hattie Delaro (credited as Hattie De Laro)

== Chapter titles ==
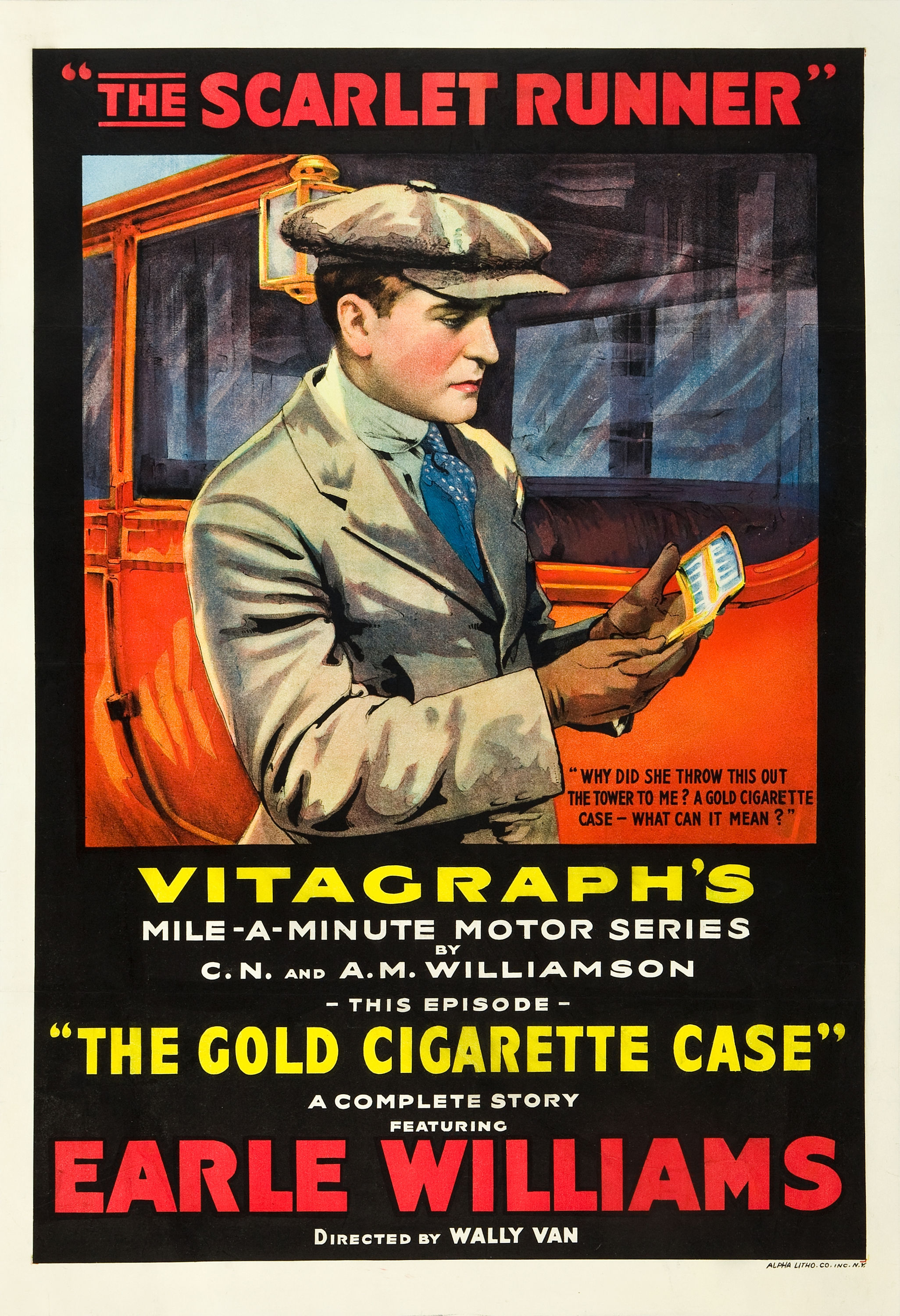
'The Gold Cigarette Case' episode poster

1. The Car and His Majesty
2. The Nuremberg Watch
3. The Masked Ball
4. The Hidden Prince
5. The Jacobean House
6. The Mysterious Motor Car
7. The Red Whiskered Man
8. The Glove and the Ring
9. The Gold Cigarette Case
10. The Lost Girl
11. The Missing Chapter
12. The Car and the Girl

== See also ==
- List of film serials
- List of film serials by studio
