= Passion's Playground =

1920 film by Thomas A. Barry

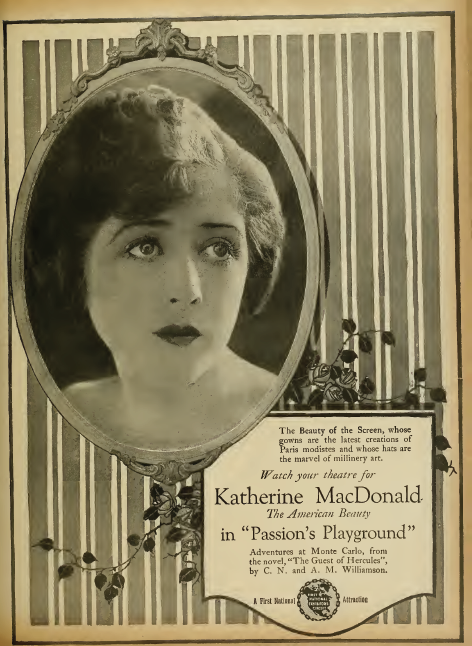
- Advertisement in Motion Picture Classic
- Directed by: J. A. Barry
- Written by: Charles Norris Williamson; Alice Muriel Williamson
- Produced by: Katherine MacDonald
- Starring: Katherine MacDonald; Norman Kerry; Nell Craig
- Cinematography: Joseph Brotherton
- Production company: Katherine MacDonald Pictures Corporation
- Distributed by: First National Exhibitors
- Release date: April 1920
- Running time: 5 reels
- Country: United States
- Language: Silent (English intertitles)
- Box office: $1 million

Passion's Playground is a 1920 American silent drama film produced by and starring Katherine MacDonald. Rudolph Valentino has a featured part in the film billed as Rudolph Valentine. The film is based on the novel The Guests of Hercules by Charles Norris Williamson and Alice Muriel Williamson. This film is presumed lost.

== Plot ==
As described in a film magazine, Mary Grant, an orphan, leaves an Italian convent and goes to Monte Carlo where, with beginner's luck, she breaks the bank. When her unsophisticated ways lead men to make unseemly advances, she is protected by Prince Angelo Della Robbia, whom she later promises to marry. His brother's wife comes to visit her and she learns that she is Marie Grant, a former student of the same convent who several years earlier had eloped with a man who then deserted her. When a former sweetheart of her husband accuses her of the deed, she places the blame on Mary. Mary goes to a chateau in the mountains. When her life is threatened by crooks, the Prince, after learning the truth of the matter, comes to her rescue, and a happy ending follows.

== Cast ==
- Katherine MacDonald as Mary Grant
- Norman Kerry as Prince Vanno Della Robbia
- Nell Craig as Marie Grant
- Edwin Stevens as Lord Dauntry
- Virginia Ainsworth as Lady Dauntry
- Rudolph Valentino as Prince Angelo Della Robbia (credited as Rudolph Valentine)
- Alice Wilson as Dodo Wardrop
- Howard Gaye as James Hanaford
- Fanny Ferrari as Idina Bland
- Sylvia Jocelyn as Molly Maxwell
- Walt Whitman as Cure of Roquebrune

== See also ==
- List of lost films
