= The Higher Law (1914 film) =

1914 film

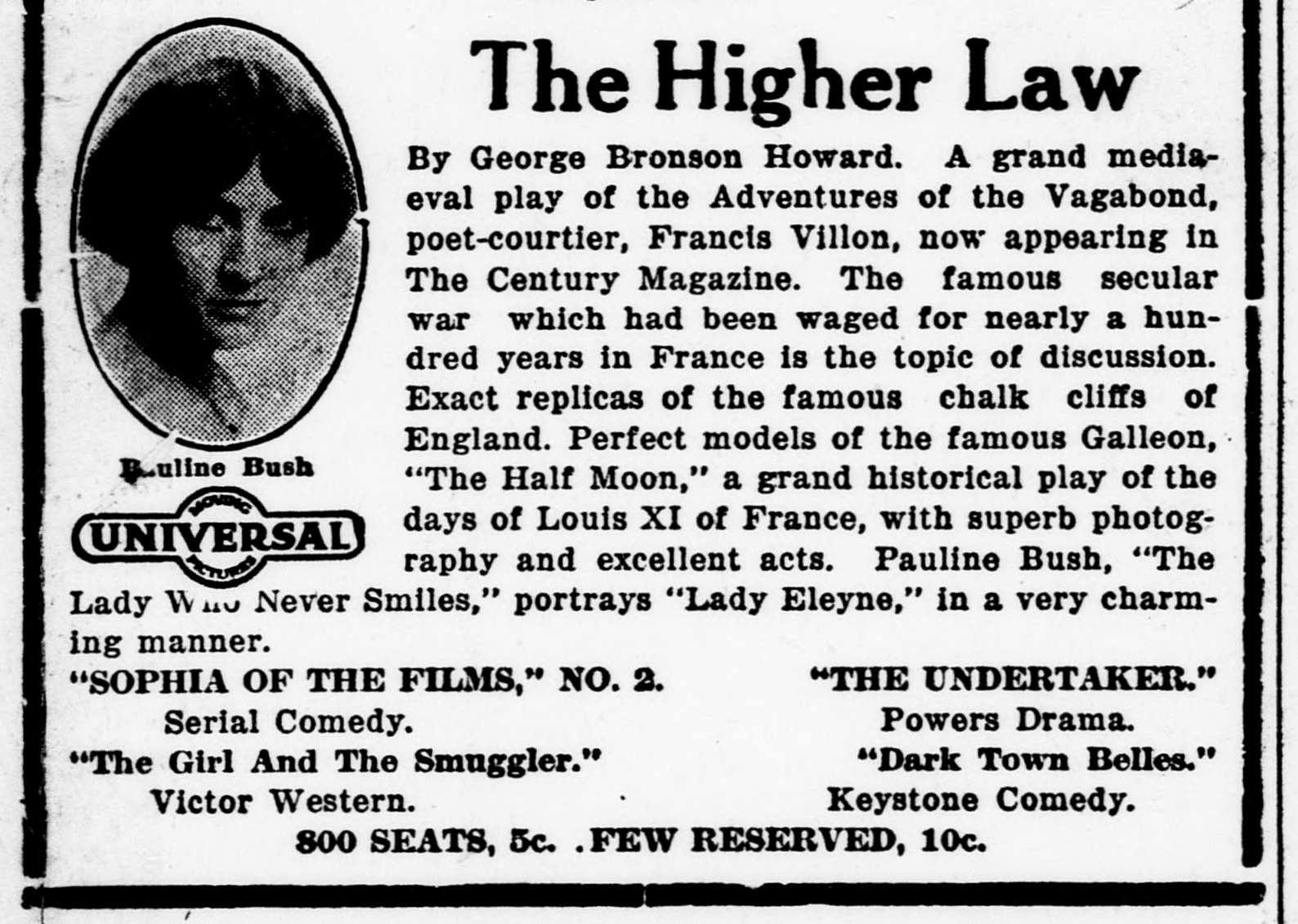
- Newspaper advertisement
- Directed by: Charles Giblyn
- Written by: George Bronson Howard; Harry G. Stafford
- Produced by: Joe De Grasse
- Starring: Murdock MacQuarrie; Lon Chaney; Pauline Bush
- Cinematography: Lee O. Bartholomew
- Distributed by: Universal Pictures
- Release date: September 19, 1914
- Running time: 20 minutes (2 reels)
- Country: United States
- Language: Silent with English intertitles

The Higher Law is a 1914 American silent drama film directed by Charles Giblyn and featuring Murdock MacQuarrie, Pauline Bush and Lon Chaney. It was written by Harry G. Stafford, based on a story by George Bronson Howard. This film was the second in a series of four films called The Adventures of Francois Villon. Lon Chaney was featured in this one, as well as in the first installment, The Oubliette (1914), but did not appear in the other two. The film is now considered to be lost. The film co-starred Millard K. Wilson, who became a lifelong friend of Chaney and later served as his director in films at M-G-M.

== Plot ==
The King of France, Louis XI, extends an offer of peace to Edward IV of England. King Edward's treacherous advisor, Sir Stephen, advises him to reject the offer. King Louis asks Francois Villon for his advice, and Villon tells the king that he should get rid of Sir Stephen once and for all. Villon travels to England to deal with the problem and hires a beautiful young woman (the Lady Eleyne) to seduce Sir Stephen. She lures him to her father's castle., where he is made to look like a prowler, and Villon and his men execute him. Villon then returns to France to facilitate the peace treaty, free of Sir Stephen's interference.

== Cast ==
- Murdock MacQuarrie as François Villon
- Pauline Bush as Lady Eleyne
- Doc Crane as King Louis XI
- Lon Chaney as Sir Stephen Fitz Allen
- Millard K. Wilson
- Chester Withey (credited as Chet Withey)
- Jessalyn Van Trump

== Reception ==
Moving Picture World wrote: "This is the second of the series being produced by Charles Giblyn, picturing scenes in the life of the vagabond poet, Francois Villon. Murdock MacQuarrie has the name part and Pauline Bush and Lon Chaney are also in the cast. In this number Villon acts as the emissary of Louis XI, and by his wits succeeds in luring to destruction Sir Stephen, favorite of Edward IV. The atmosphere and costuming are good, and the final scenes dramatic and stirring. Villon appears to advantage in his more poetical aspects. In this incident he is a little too much of the villain. But the prediction is a commendable one, and above the average in general construction."

Motion Picture News wrote: "The director, Charles Giblyn, has proven himself worthy of great praise. The old costumes and castles, the joviality of the tap-room, the dignified and stately action of the court followers, all lend a decidedly mediaeval atmosphere to the picture...but the picture does not rely solely on its meritorious costumes and atmosphere for success. There is sufficient scheming, brawls, duel scenes and the like to appease the appetites of the keen lovers of sensationalism, and those who would not be content with the great character study that the picture offers."
