= My Lady's Latchkey =

1921 film

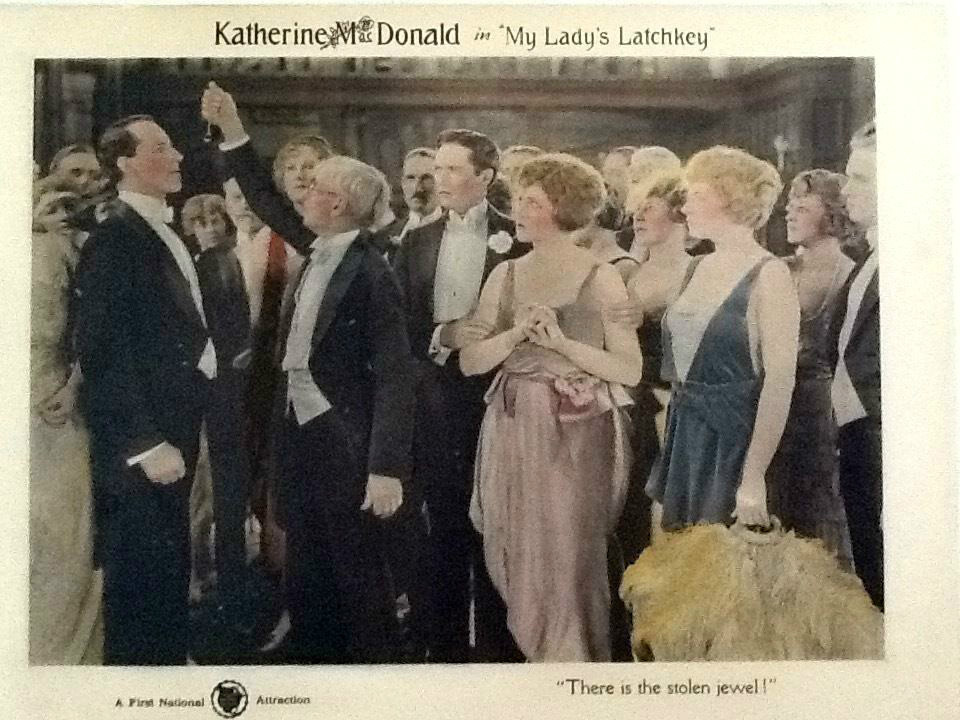
- Lobby card
- Directed by: Edwin Carewe
- Screenplay by: Finis Fox
- Based on: The Second Latchkey by: Charles Norris Williamson; Alice Muriel Williamson
- Starring: Katherine MacDonald; Edmund Lowe; Claire Du Brey; Howard Gaye; Lenore Lynard; Thomas Jefferson
- Cinematography: Joseph Brotherton
- Production company: Katherine MacDonald Pictures
- Distributed by: Associated First National Pictures
- Release date: January 1921
- Running time: 60 minutes
- Country: United States
- Language: English

My Lady's Latchkey is a 1921 American mystery film directed by Edwin Carewe and written by Finis Fox. It is based on the 1920 novel The Second Latchkey by Charles Norris Williamson and Alice Muriel Williamson. The film stars Katherine MacDonald, Edmund Lowe, Claire Du Brey, Howard Gaye, Lenore Lynard and Thomas Jefferson. The film was released in January 1921, by Associated First National Pictures.

== Cast ==
- Katherine MacDonald as Annesley Grayle
- Edmund Lowe as Nelson Smith
- Claire Du Brey as Countess Santiago
- Howard Gaye as Lord Annesley-Seton
- Lenore Lynard as Lady Annesley-Seton
- Thomas Jefferson as Ruthven Smith
- Helena Phillips Evans as Mrs. Ellsworth

== Preservation ==
With no prints of My Lady's Latchkey located in any film archives, it is considered a lost film.
