= The Jackals of a Great City =

1916 film

- Directed by: Edward LeSaint
- Written by: Harvey Gates
- Produced by: Universal Studios' "Gold Seal" unit
- Starring: Harry Carey
- Distributed by: Universal Pictures
- Release date: June 27, 1916
- Running time: 2 reels
- Country: United States
- Languages: Silent, with English intertitles

The Jackals of a Great City is a 1916 American short silent drama film, directed by Edward LeSaint and featuring Harry Carey.

== Cast ==
- Harry Carey as Tom Wayne
- Stella LeSaint as Stella Razeto
- Jean Hathaway as Leila's Grandmother
- Hayward Mack as Clay Wimburn

== See also ==
- Harry Carey filmography
