= T. D. Crittenden =

American actor

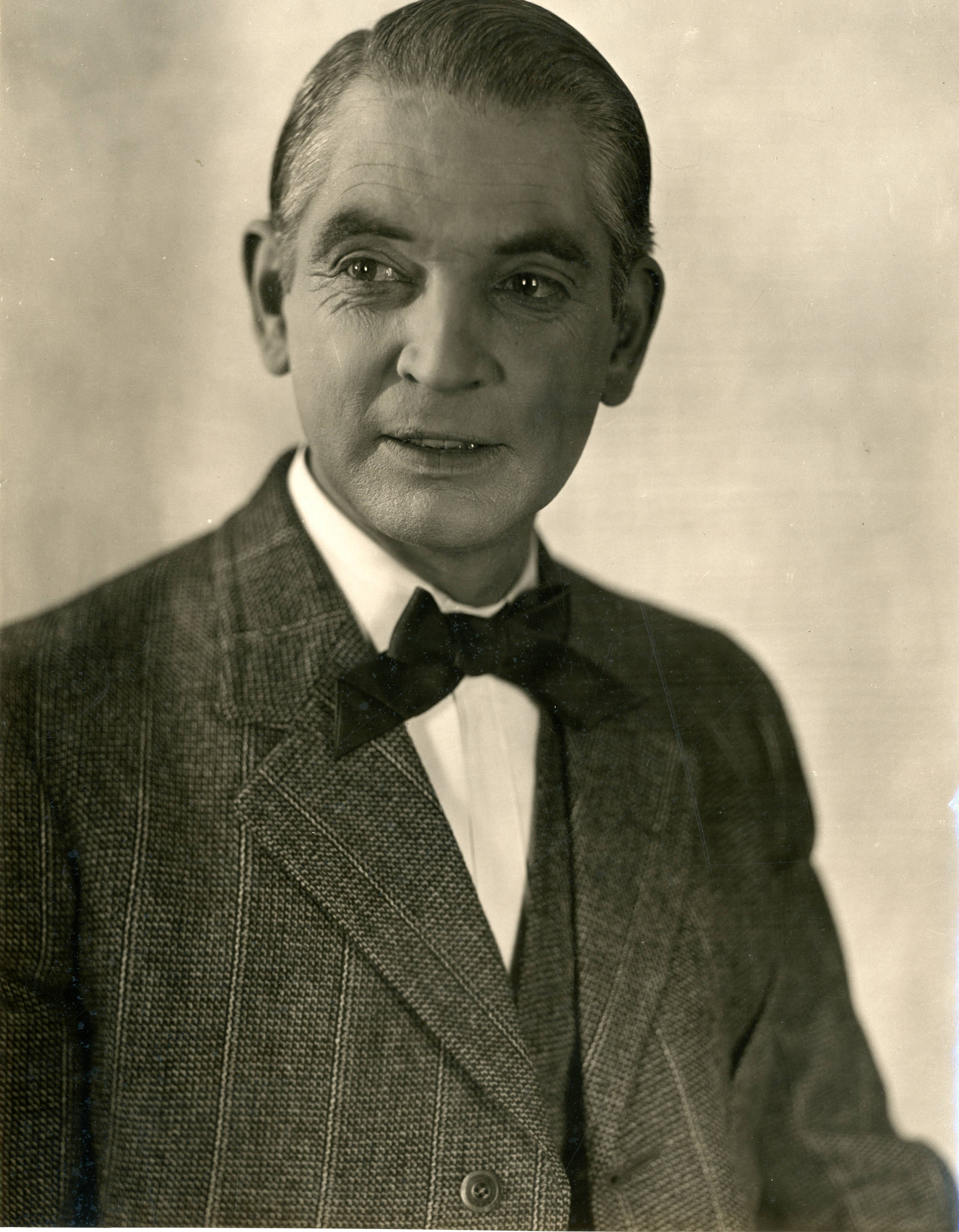
- Born: September 27, 1878; Oakland, California, US
- Died: February 17, 1938 (aged 59); Los Angeles, California, US
- Occupation: Actor
- Years active: 1912–1924

T. D. Crittenden (né Trockwood Dwight Crittenden; September 27, 1878 – February 17, 1938) was an American actor of the silent era. He appeared in more than 60 films between 1912 and 1924. He was born in Oakland, California, and died in Los Angeles, California.

== Selected filmography ==
- When the Gods Played a Badger Game (1915)
- All for Peggy (1915)
- The Trust (1915)
- Jewel (1915)
- Lord John in New York (1915)
- The Mark of Cain (1916)
- Her Husband's Faith (1916)
- The Fighting Gringo (1917)
- The Honor of an Outlaw (1917)
- The Lash of Power (1917)
- The Saintly Sinner (1917)
- The Winged Mystery (1917)
- The Gray Ghost (1917)
- The Veiled Adventure (1919)
- The Miracle Man (1919)
- The Hoodlum (1919)
- The False Code (1919)
- The Little Shepherd of Kingdom Come (1920)
- Pinto (1920)
- A Tale of Two Worlds (1921)
- High Heels (1921)
- Bob Hampton of Placer (1921)
- The Old Nest (1921) as Dr. Horace Anthon
- Under Oath (1922)
- The Woman's Side (1922)
- The Hottentot (1922)
- Pioneer Trails (1923)

== Bibliography ==
=== References ===
Books, journals, magazines, websites, papers
- Gale, Lillian R., ed. (1921). Motion Picture Studio Directory and Trade Annual (7th ed.). Motion Picture News. Retrieved June 6, 2024. OCLC 49486935 (all editions).
1. "Actors". "Crittenden, Dwight". 1921. p. 165 – via Internet Archive (Prelinger Library).
News media
- Los Angeles Times (The) (February 18, 1938). "Two Officers Die in Battle With Maniac". The Los Angeles Times (re: "Deputy Marshal T. Dwight Crittenden"). Vol. 57. pp. 1 (column 3), 6 (column 3), 12 – via Newspapers.com. LCCN sn81-4356; ISSN 0458-3035.
