= Albert MacQuarrie =

American actor (1882–1950)

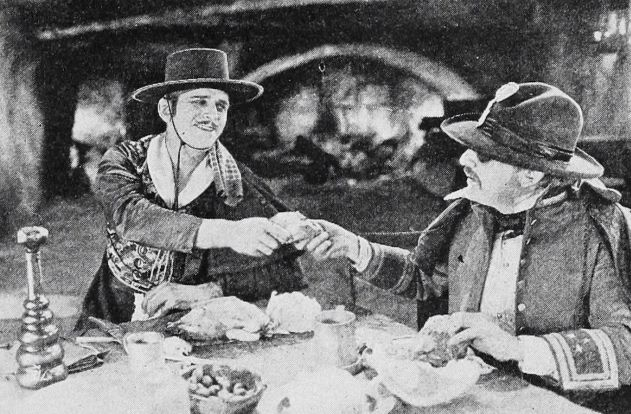
- Douglas Fairbanks and Albert MacQuarrie in Don Q, Son of Zorro (1925)
- Born: January 8, 1882; San Francisco, California, U.S.
- Died: February 17, 1950 (aged 68); Hollywood, California, U.S.
- Years active: 1912–1930

Albert MacQuarrie (January 8, 1882 – February 17, 1950) was an American silent film actor.

He was signed in 1912 and starred in about 70 films before his retirement.

He starred with William Garwood in films such as Lord John in New York and The Grey Sisterhood and also starred regularly with Douglas Fairbanks.

He later became a studio make-up artist, and died in Los Angeles at the age of 68.

== Filmography ==
- Safety First (1915)
- The Prayer of a Horse or: His Life Story Told by Himself (1915)
- Things in the Bottom Drawer (1915)
- The Whirling Disk (1915)
- At the Banquet Table (1915)
- The Smuggler's Lass (1915)
- A Harmless Flirtation (1915)
- The Ulster Lass (1915)
- A Little Brother of the Rich (1915) as Muriel's Husband
- A Pure Gold Partner (1915)
- The Frame-Up (1915) as Ned Harter
- Colorado (1915) as Mr. Staples
- Lord John in New York (1915) as Doctor Ramese
- The Grey Sisterhood (1916) as Doctor Ramese
- Three Fingered Jenny (1916) as Doctor Ramese
- The Target (1916) as James Fowler
- A Serpent in the House (1916)
- The Golden Boots (1916)
- Mutiny (1916)
- From Broadway to a Throne (1916) as Emissary
- A Man's Hardest Fight (1916)
- If My Country Should Call (1916) as Col. Belden
- Manhattan Madness (1916)
- The Chalice of Sorrow (1916) as Pietro
- The Oil Smeller (1916)
- The Better Man (1916)
- The Eagle's Wings (1916) as Keron Theris
- The Melody of Death (1917)
- John Osborne's Triumph (1917)
- Perils of the Secret Service (1917)
- The Pulse of Life (1917) as 'Dago' Joe
- Mr. Dolan of New York (1917) as Count Conrad
- The Almost Good Man (1917)
- The Flopping Uplifter (1917)
- High Speed (1917) as Count Englantine
- The Clean-Up (1917) as Ed Linder
- The Midnight Man (1917) as The 'Eel'
- A Dream of Egypt (1917)
- The Master Spy (1917)
- The Lion's Lair (1917)
- A Prince for a Day (1917)
- The High Sign (1917) as Nickelob
- The Midnight Man (1917) as The 'Eel'
- Bound in Morocco (1918)
- He Comes Up Smiling (1918) as Batchelor
- A Bum Bomb (1918)
- Under False Pretenses (1918)
- Arizona (1918) as Lt. Hatton
- The Knickerbocker Buckaroo (1919) as Manual Lopez
- The Little Diplomat (1919) as Kendall
- His Majesty, the American (1919)
- When the Clouds Roll By (1919) as Hobson
- The Moon Riders (1920) as Gant, Crooked Attorney
- The Mollycoddle (1920) as Driver of the Desert Yacht
- The Mark of Zorro (1920)
- Cheated Hearts (1921) as Hassam
- The Scrapper (1922) as Simms
- One Clear Call (1922) as Jim Holbrook
- Bulldog Courage (1922) as John Morton
- The Lavender Bath Lady (1922) as Dorgan
- The Super-Sex (1922) as Cousin Roy
- The Flaming Hour (1922) as Jones
- Crimson Gold (1923) as David Ellis
- The Hunchback of Notre Dame (1923)
- What Three Men Wanted (1924)
- Don Q Son of Zorro (1925) as Col. Matsado
- The Gaucho (1927) as Victim of the Black Doom
- The Viking (1928) as Kark
- The Ship from Shanghai (1930) as Sailor
