= Sky Raiders (1931 film) =

1931 film

- Directed by: Christy Cabanne
- Screenplay by: Harvey Gates
- Starring: Lloyd Hughes; Marceline Day; Wheeler Oakman; Walter Miller; Emerson Treacy
- Cinematography: Allen G. Siegler
- Edited by: Gene Havlick
- Production company: Columbia Pictures
- Release date: 15 May 1931
- Running time: 60 minutes
- Country: United States
- Language: English

Sky Raiders is a 1931 film directed by Christy Cabanne and starring Lloyd Hughes and Marceline Day. Produced by Columbia Pictures, it was filmed at Grand Central Air Terminal, later Grand Central Airport in Glendale, California.

== Plot ==
Bob, a daredevil aviator, is in love with Grace. His reckless behavior and addiction to alcohol causes the death of Grace's brother, and Bob subsequently loses his job and Grace's love. Bob puts his life back together and catches a gang of hijackers who were robbing gold shipments from mid-air flights.
