= The League of the Future =

1916 short film by Edward LeSaint

- Directed by: Edward J. Le Saint
- Written by: Harvey Gates (Scenario)
- Starring: William Garwood; Malcolm Blevins; Stella Razeto; Laura Oakley; Carmen Phillips
- Distributed by: Universal Film Manufacturing Company
- Release date: March 28, 1916
- Running time: 3 reels
- Country: United States
- Languages: Silent film English intertitles

The League of the Future is a 1916 American silent short directed by Edward J. Le Saint. Starring William Garwood in the lead role, it is the fifth in the five film series Lord John's Journal.

== Cast ==
- William Garwood as Lord John
- Malcolm Blevins as Richard Wayne
- Stella Razeto as Maida Odell
- Laura Oakley as Head Sister
- Carmen Phillips as Jenny

== See also ==
- Lord John in New York (1915)
- The Grey Sisterhood (1916)
- Three Fingered Jenny (1916)
- The Eye of Horus (1916)
