= Doc Crane =

American actor

- Born: c. 1847; Baltimore, Maryland, United States
- Died: April 17, 1920 (aged 72 - 73); California, United States
- Occupation: Film actor
- Years active: 1914–1920

Doc Crane (c. 1847 – April 17, 1920) was an American silent film actor.

Crane was a medical doctor in Boston who served in the Civil War and returned to his practice after its end. When he was 65, he moved to California to retire. After financial difficulties depleted his savings, he found work as a character actor at Universal studios, drawing upon his experience in amateur dramatic productions when he was in medical school.

He was signed in 1914 and starred in about 30 films before his retirement three years later in 1917.

== Filmography ==
- The Higher Law (1914) as King Louis XI
- The Last Volunteer (1914) as Raolf Ardelheim
- The Oubliette (1914) as King Louis XI
- The Tragedy of Whispering Creek (1914) as Prospector
- The Gambler's Oath (1914)
- Father and the Boys (1915)
- The Beloved Vagabond (1915) as Asticot
- Lord John in New York (1915) as L.J. Calit
- The College Orphan (1915) as Socrates
- The Broken Coin (1915) as Pawnbroker
- The Melting Pot (1915) as Quincy Davenport
- Mixed Blood (1916)
- A Woman's Eyes (1916)
- A Daughter of the Night (1916)
- The Human Cactus (1916)
- What Love Can Do (1916) (as H.F. Crane) as Matthew
- A Youth of Fortune (1916) as Professor Higgenbotham
- Drugged Waters (1916) as Dr. Jennings
- The Red Lie (1916)
- Discontent (1916)
- The Grey Sisterhood (1916)
- Flirting with Death (1917)
- The Blood of His Fathers (1917) as John Graham
- The Lure of the Circus (1917)
- Jungle Treachery (1917)
- Flirting with Death (1917)
- The Hidden Spring (1917) (as H.F. Crane) as Daniel Kerston
- The Doctor's Deception (1917)
- The Spirit of Romance (1917) (as H.F. Crane) as Mace
- Mary from America (1917)
- Pollyanna (1920) (bit role; uncredited)
