= Walter Belasco =

Canadian actor

- Born: January 1, 1864; Vancouver, Colony of British Columbia
- Died: 21 June 1939 (aged 75); San Francisco, California
- Occupation: Actor

Walter Belasco (December 1864 – 21 June 1939) was a Canadian silent film actor.

== Selected filmography ==
Year	Film	Character	Notes
1915	Judge Not; or The Woman of Mona Diggings	Barkeeper	
1915	Lord John's Journal	Paola Tostini	5-film series
1916	Lord John's Journal	Paola Tostini	5-film series
1916	The Grip of Jealousy	Uncle Jeff	
1916	John Needham's Double	Dobbins	
1918	Phoney Photos		
