= Laura Oakley =

American actress

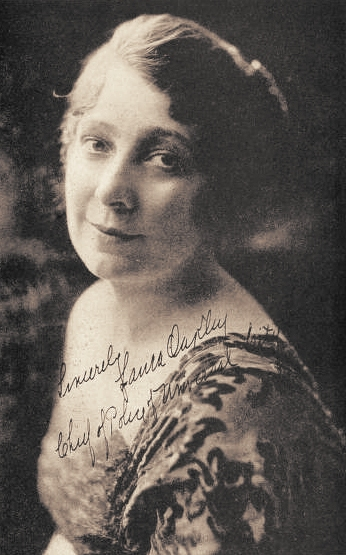
- Oakley, 1915
- Born: July 10, 1879; Oakland, California
- Died: January 30, 1957 (aged 77); Altadena, California
- Resting place: Mountain View Cemetery; Altadena, CA; MVMN 37 AN 12
- Other names: Laura Oakley Moore
- Occupation(s): Actress, police chief of Universal City, California
- Years active: 1912–1920
- Spouse: Milton Moore
- Children: 2

Laura Oakley (July 10, 1879 – January 30, 1957) was an American silent film actress.

== Biography ==
Born in Oakland, California on July 10, 1879, Oakley was signed in 1912 by the Keystone Film Company and starred in about 50 films before her retirement from film in 1920. She starred with William Garwood in films such as Lord John in New York and The Grey Sisterhood.

In 1913, Oakley was elected police chief of Universal City, California, shortly after it was incorporated, when 8 of the 28 city's official positions were won by women. A little over a year later, she was sworn in as police officer number 99 of Los Angeles.

In September 1915, Oakley married Universal Pictures cinematographer Milton Moore.

Oakley died on January 30, 1957, in Altadena, California, survived by two children and six grandchildren. She was interred at Mountain View Cemetery and Mausoleum, mausoleum section MVMN, map 37, column AN, row 12, in Altadena.

== Filmography ==
=== Films ===
- 1916 The Dumb Girl of Portici - Rilla.
- 1916 The League of the Future - Head Sister
- 1916 Their Act
- 1916 Shackles
- 1916 The Eye of Horus - Head Sister
- 1916 Three Fingered Jenny - Head Sister
- 1916 The Grey Sisterhood - Head Sister
- 1918 Two-Gun Betty - Miss Ambrose.
- 1920 The Vanishing Dagger - Lady Mary Latimer
- The Little Upstart (1915)
- Lord John in New York (1915) as Head Sister
- Dan Cupid: Fixer (1915)
- The Great Ruby Mystery (1915)
- The Rise and Fall of Officer 13 (1915)
- The Tale of His Pants (1915)
- An Idyll of the Hills (1915)
- The Human Menace (1915)
- The Black Box (1915) as Laura
- Changed Lives (1915)
- The Star of the Sea (1915) as Janice
- Her Escape (1914) as Undetermined Role
- Lights and Shadows (1914)
- Her Life's Story (1914) as Sister Agnes
- A Prince of Bavaria (1914)
- Don't Monkey with the Buzz Saw (1914)
- The Bingville Fire Department (1914)
- Fleeing from the Fleas (1914)
- A Disenchantment (1914)
- McBride's Bride (1914)
- Pawns of Destiny (1914)
- Gertie Gets the Cash (1914)
- The Seat of the Trouble (1914)
- Her First Arrest (1914)
- Hawkeye and the Cheese Mystery (1914)
- The Tale of a Dog (1914)
- The Saint and the Singer (1914)
- The Deuce and Two Pair (1914)
- Too Many Cooks (1914)
- The Romance of a Photograph (1914)
- Just Mother (1914)
- The Buccaneers (1913)
- Under the Black Flag (1913)
- Their Two Kids (1913) as Ma Ford
- Memories (1913) as Life's Handmaiden
- The Fight Against Evil (1913)
- The Girl Ranchers (1913)
- Sally Scraggs, Housemaid (1913) as Mrs. Shackleton
- When His Courage Failed (1913) as The Wife
- The Power That Rules (1913)
- A Cowgirl Cinderella (1912)
