= Grace Benham =

American silent film actress

- Born: June 25, 1876; Kansas
- Died: November 19, 1968 (aged 92); Pasadena, California
- Occupation: Film actress
- Years active: 1915–1938
- Known for: silent films
- Spouse: Ogden Crane

Grace Lucile Benham (June 25, 1876 – November 19, 1968) was an American silent film actress.

Grace Lucile Benham was the daughter of C. A. Benham, a grocer.

She married Ogden Crane in 1907 in Sherman, Texas. Both of them were actors in Helen Grantley's theatrical company at the time.

== Filmography ==
- Lord John in New York (1915) as Grace Callender
- Alien Souls (1916) as Mrs. Conway
- The Flirt (1917) as Laura, Her Sister
- Dangerous to Know (1938) as Guest at Party
