= Smith's Magazine =

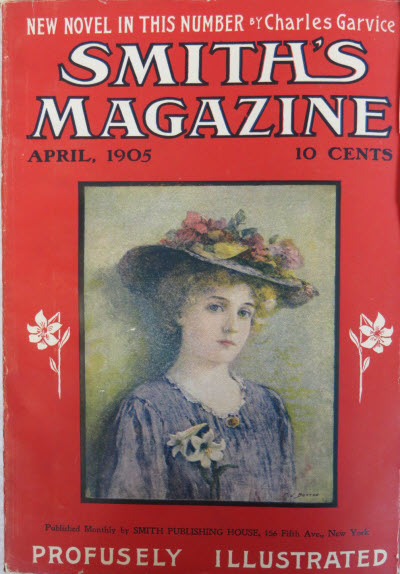
Volume 1, issue 1, April 1905

Smith's Magazine was a Street & Smith magazine published monthly from April 1905 to February 1922.

Created for the "John Smiths" of the world, Theodore Dreiser was its initial editor; after a year, he moved to Broadway Magazine. By the time Dreiser departed, the magazine had a circulation of 125,000.

Charles A. MacLean became editor of Smith's as well as another, more successful Street & Smith magazine, The Popular Magazine, for many years.

Originally a story magazine directed at the general public, it later focused on a female audience. When the magazine ended its run, Street & Smith merged it and its mainly female readership into the newer, eventually even more successful Love Story Magazine.

Smith's was the first magazine to publish author Ben Ames Williams, in July 1915.

== External ==
- Media related to Smith's Magazine at Wikimedia Commons
- Archive of selected magazine covers
