= Three Fingered Jenny =

1916 film by Edward LeSaint

- Directed by: Edward J. Le Saint
- Written by: Harvey Gates (Scenario)
- Starring: William Garwood; Malcolm Blevins; Stella Razeto; Laura Oakley; Carmen Phillips
- Distributed by: Universal Film Manufacturing Company
- Release date: February 1, 1916
- Running time: 3 reels
- Country: United States
- Languages: Silent film English intertitles

Three Fingered Jenny is a 1916 American silent short mystery directed by Edward LeSaint written by Harvey Gates. Starring William Garwood in the lead role, it was the third film in the five film series of Lord John's Journal.

== Cast ==
- William Garwood as Lord John
- Stella Razeto as Maida Odell
- Carmen Phillips as Jenny
- Malcolm Blevins as Richard Wayne
- Laura Oakley as Head Sister
- Albert MacQuarrie as Doctor Ramese

== See also ==
- Lord John in New York (1915)
- The Grey Sisterhood (1916)
- The Eye of Horus (1916)
- The League of the Future (1916)
