= Ogden Crane =

American actor

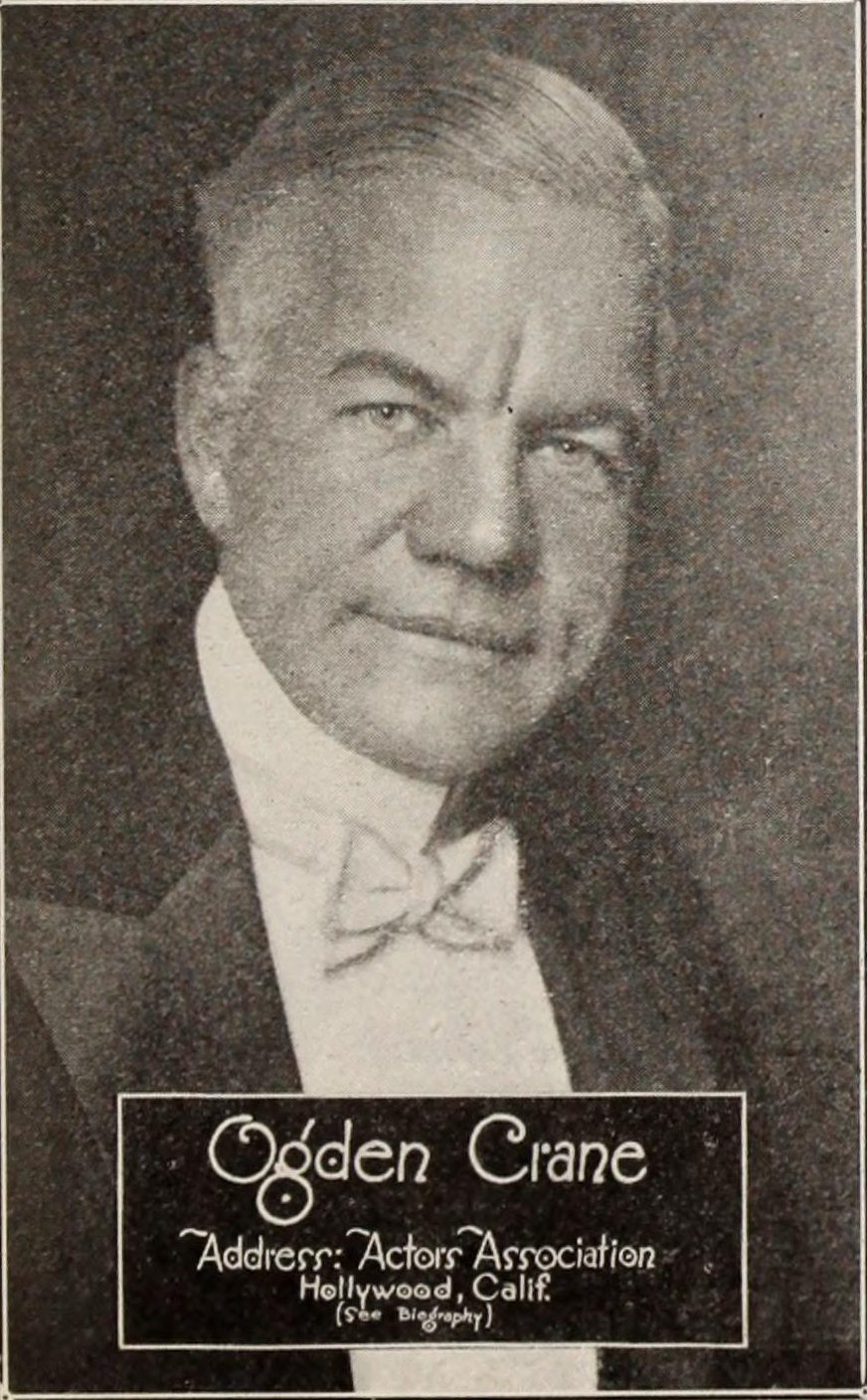
- Born: Harry Ogden Crane; September 1, 1873; Brooklyn, New York, US
- Died: May 14, 1940 (aged 66); Hollywood, California, US
- Occupation: Actor
- Years active: 1911–1923
- Known for: Silent films
- Spouse: Grace Benham
- Mother: Sarah Mundell Crane

Harry Ogden Crane (September 1, 1873 – May 14, 1940) was an American silent film actor.

The son of concert singer Sarah Mundell Crane, he was married to Grace Benham.

== Filmography ==
=== 1910s ===
- Caprice (1913)
- Lord John's Journal (1915–1916; 5-film series) as Roger Odell
- The Parson of Panamint (1916) as Absolom Randall
- The Light of Western Stars (1918)
- The Valley of the Giants (1919) as Mayor Poundstone

=== 1920s ===
==== 1920 ====
- Sic-Em as Stephen Hamilton
- Her Five-Foot Highness as Lesley Saunders
- The Dwelling Place of Light as Chester Sprole
- Wedding Blues
- The Corsican Brothers

==== 1921 ====
- The Greater Profit as Creightoon Hardage
- See My Lawyer as T. Hamilton Brown
- Southern Exposure
- Oh Buddy!
- The Invisible Fear (1921) as John Randall

==== 1923 ====
- Navy Blues (1923)
