= Harvey Gates =

American screenwriter

- Born: January 19, 1894; Hawaii, USA
- Died: November 4, 1948 (aged 54); Los Angeles, California, USA
- Occupation: Screenwriter
- Years active: 1913-1948

Harvey Harris Gates (January 19, 1894 – November 4, 1948) was an American screenwriter of the silent era. He wrote for more than 200 films between 1913 and 1948. He was born in Hawaii and died in Los Angeles, California.

== Selected filmography ==
- I Was Meant for You (1913)
- Lord John's Journal (1915)
- Three Fingered Jenny (1916)
- Her Defiance (1916)
- The Three Godfathers (1916)
- The Jackals of a Great City (1916)
- The Committee on Credentials (1916)
- For the Love of a Girl (1916)
- The Edge of the Law (1917)
- Hell Morgan's Girl (1917)
- Society's Driftwood (1917)
- Bull's Eye (1917)
- A Rich Man's Darling (1918)
- The Wine Girl (1918)
- Madame Spy (1918)
- A Broadway Scandal (1918)
- The Marriage Lie (1918)
- The Wicked Darling (1919)
- Ravished Armenia (1919)
- The Midnight Man (1919)
- The Exquisite Thief (1919)
- The Face in the Watch (1919)
- West Is Best (1920)
- The Screaming Shadow (1920)
- Masked (1920)
- The Fightin' Terror (1920)
- Blue Streak McCoy (1920)
- The Fighting Lover (1921)
- Action (1921)
- A Daughter of the Law (1921)
- Belle of Alaska (1922)
- Red Courage (1921)
- The Fire Eater (1921)
- The Sting of the Lash (1921)
- Headin' West (1922)
- Environment (1922)
- The Golden Gallows (1922)
- Man Under Cover (1922)
- The Drug Traffic (1923)
- Sawdust (1923)
- Merry-Go-Round (1923)
- The Six-Fifty (1923)
- The Clean Up (1923)
- The Fighting American (1924)
- The Slanderers (1924)
- Behind the Curtain (1924)
- One Glorious Night (1924)
- The Breathless Moment (1924)
- The Flaming Forties (1924)
- Soft Shoes (1925)
- Beyond the Border (1925)
- Silent Sanderson (1925)
- The Crimson Runner (1925)
- The Bad Lands (1925)
- The Barrier (1926)
- Driftin' Thru (1926)
- Life of an Actress (1927)
- The Brute (1927)
- The Black Diamond Express (1927)
- The Bush Leaguer (1927)
- Brass Knuckles (1927)
- Rinty of the Desert (1928)
- Across the Atlantic (1928)
- Say It with Songs (1929)
- The Desert Song (1929)
- The Forward Pass (1929)
- Thus is Life (1930)
- What a Man! (1930)
- Sky Raiders (1931)
- Madame Racketeer (1932)
- The County Fair (1932)
- O'Shaughnessy's Boy (1935)
- Werewolf of London (1935)
- Luck of Roaring Camp (1937)
- Navy Secrets (1939)
- Fugitive at Large (1939)
- Let's Get Tough! (1942)
- Black Dragons (1942)
- 'Neath Brooklyn Bridge (1942)
- Northwest Trail (1945)
