= Oh! Susanna (disambiguation) =

Oh! Susanna may refer to:

- "Oh! Susanna", a song written by Stephen Foster in 1847
- Suzie Ungerleider, a Canadian singer who formerly performed as Oh Susanna
- The Gale Storm Show, a television series known in syndication as Oh, Susanna
- Oh Susanna, a Canadian improvisation variety show
- Oh! Susanna (1951 film), a 1951 Western film starring Rod Cameron
- Oh, Susanna! (1936 film), a Western film directed by Joseph Kane
- Oh, Susannah!, a 1982 novel by Kate Wilhelm
- Oh! Susannah!, an 1897 comedy play by Mark Ambient
