= Park Frame =

American actor and film director

- Born: November 17, 1889; Seattle, Washington, United States
- Died: June 2, 1943 (aged 53); California, United States
- Occupations: Director, actor
- Years active: 1916–1925 (film)

Park Frame (1889–1943) was an American actor and film director of the silent era.

== Selected filmography ==
=== Director ===
- The Pagan God (1919)
- The Gray Wolf's Ghost (1919)
- The Man Who Turned White (1919)
- For a Woman's Honor (1919)
- The Forgotten Woman (1921)
- Looped for Life (1924)
- The Drug Store Cowboy (1925)

=== Assistant director ===
- 7th Heaven (1927)
- High School Hero (1927)
- Road House (1928)

=== Actor ===
- Flashing Spurs (1924)
- The Train Wreckers (1927)

== Bibliography ==
- Golden, Eve. John Gilbert: The Last of the Silent Film Stars. University Press of Kentucky, 2013.
