= Forgotten Women =

Forgotten Women may refer to:

- The Isle of Forgotten Women, a 1927 American silent drama film, released as Forgotten Women in the UK
- The Forgotten Woman (1921 film), a 1921 American melodrama film directed by Park Frame
- Forgotten Women (1931 film), a 1931 film written by Adele Buffington
- Forgotten Women (1949 film), a 1949 American drama film
