= The Sunset Trail =

The Sunset Trail is the name of several films.

- The Sunset Trail (1917 film), an American silent drama
- The Sunset Trail (1924 film), an American silent western
- The Sunset Trail (1932 film), an American western
- Sunset Trail, an American western from 1939
