= Olive Ann Alcorn =

American actress, model, and dancer

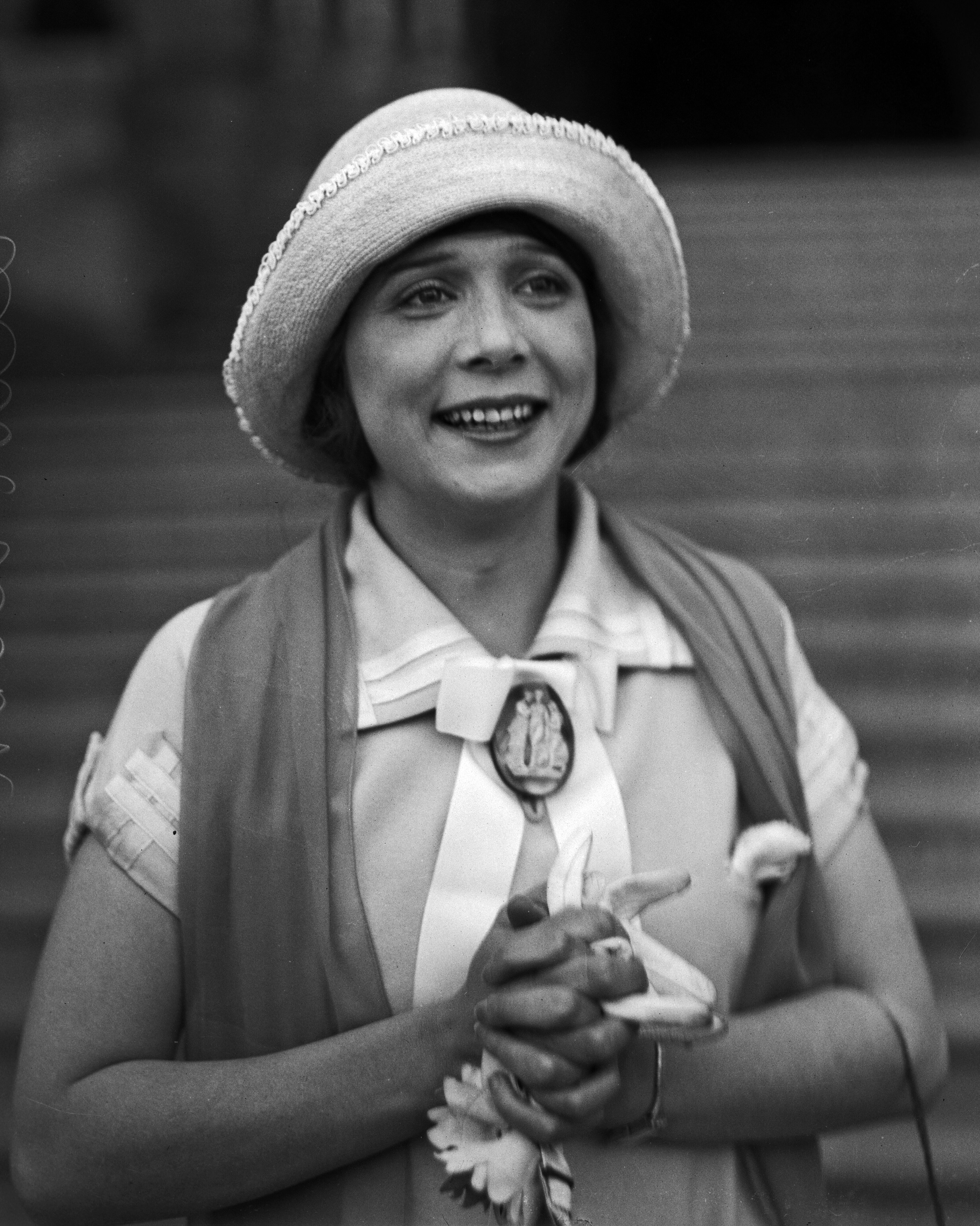
- Alcorn c. 1925
- Born: March 10, 1900; Stillwater, Minnesota, U.S.
- Died: January 8, 1972 (aged 71); Los Angeles, California, U.S.
- Occupations: Dancer, model, silent film actress
- Spouses: Louis H. Scherer (m. 1921; div. 1925) Harry Singer (m. 1928)

Olive Ann Alcorn (March 10, 1900 – January 8, 1972) was an American dancer, model, and silent film actress of the 1910s and 1920s. She is better remembered today for the numerous nude photographs of her from the era than for her film work.

== Life ==
Olive Ann was born in Stillwater, Minnesota. She graduated from the Denishawn School of Dancing and Related Arts, and was a member of the Denishawn Players which toured across the nation putting on performances in theaters and auditoriums.

After 1928 little is known about Olive Ann Alcorn, though it is believed she continued her involvement in dance. She married twice. Her first husband was Louis H. Scherer (divorced 1925) and her second husband was Harry Singer (married May 22, 1928).

She died in Los Angeles, California in 1972 after being diagnosed with anal cancer. She was cremated at Roosevelt Cemetery in Gardena. Her ashes were scattered in the Pacific Ocean off Santa Monica.

== Works ==
She appeared in her first film Sunnyside in 1919, a film short that starred Charlie Chaplin. She then appeared the same year in the two silent films The Long Arm of Mannister, which starred Henry B. Walthall and Helene Chadwick, and For a Woman's Honor.

In 1923 she appeared in "The Illustrators Show", a collection of one-act plays. She modeled, mostly nude, between 1919 and 1925 for Chatiau Art Studios, and she later appeared uncredited in two more films in 1925. Those productions were The Phantom of the Opera and Up the Ladder. Most of her nude modeling was utilized in the illustration Alta Art Studies Volume I, published by Alta Studios in San Francisco, California and photographed by Xan (Alexander) J. Stark.

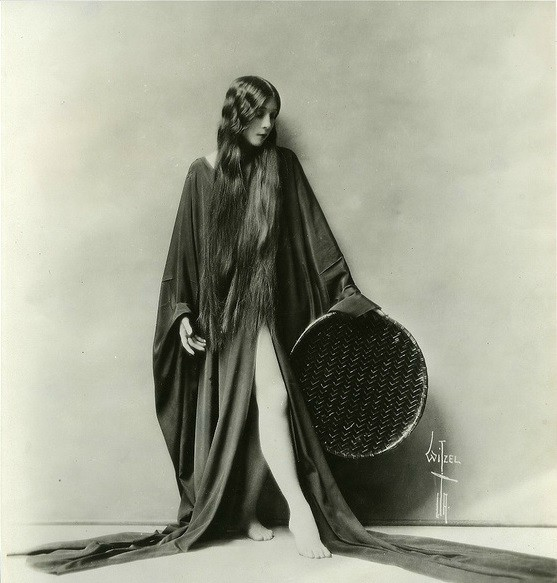
Alcorn in the 1920s.
