= Mark Ambient =

English actor and dramatist

Harold Harley (20 June 1860 – 11 August 1937), known by his pen name Mark Ambient, was an English actor and dramatist. He is particularly noted as a writer of the musical comedy The Arcadians, first produced in 1909.

He was born in Rastrick, Yorkshire, son of Robert Harley, a Congregational minister and mathematician. He was educated at Mill Hill School in London, where his father was vice-principal, and King's College, Cambridge, graduating BA in 1884.

== Works ==
- Oh! Susannah! "A Farcical Comedy" in three acts: first produced at the Eden Theatre, Brighton, opening on 6 September 1897, afterwards at the Royalty Theatre, London.
- A Little Ray of Sunshine, a play in three acts by Ambient and Wilton Heriot, was first performed in the Assembly Rooms, Yeovil, opening on 3 May 1898. The first London performance was at the Royalty Theatre, opening on 31 December 1898; it featured W. S. Penley as Lord Markham. In New York it opened at Wallack's Theatre on 28 August 1899, running for 22 performances. It was the inaugural production of the Great Queen Street Theatre, London, after its reconstruction; it ran from 24 May to 6 July 1900 (44 performances).
- A Snug Little Kingdom, "A Comedy of Bohemia" in three acts, was performed at the Royalty Theatre, running from 31 January to 28 February 1903 (28 performances). It featured Charles Warner, Lyn Harding and H. B. Warner.
- The Arcadians, "A Fantastic Musical Play" in three acts: book by Ambient and Alexander M. Thompson, lyrics by Arthur Wimperis, music by Lionel Monckton and Howard Talbot. It was first produced at the Shaftesbury Theatre, London, opening on 29 April 1909 and running for 809 performances. In New York it opened at the Liberty Theatre on 17 January 1910, running for 136 performances.
- The Light Blues, a musical comedy: book by Ambient and Jack Hulbert, lyrics by Adrian Ross, music by Howard Talbot and Herman Finck. It was first seen on a provincial tour in 1915. At the Shaftesbury Theatre in London it ran from 14 September to 30 September 1916 (20 performances).
