= The Gray Wolf's Ghost =

1919 film

- Directed by: Park Frame; Joseph Franz
- Written by: Bret Harte (novel); Fred Myton
- Produced by: Jesse D. Hampton
- Starring: Lurline Lyons; Rita Stanwood; Hector V. Sarno
- Production company: Jesse D. Hampton Productions
- Distributed by: Robertson-Cole Distributing Corporation
- Release date: October 26, 1919
- Running time: 50 minutes
- Country: United States
- Languages: Silent; English intertitles

The Gray Wolf's Ghost is a 1919 American silent Western film directed by Park Frame and Joseph Franz and starring Lurline Lyons, Rita Stanwood and Hector V. Sarno.

== Cast ==
- Lurline Lyons as Dona Maria Saltonstall
- Rita Stanwood as Señorita Maruja Saltonstall
- Hector V. Sarno as Pereo
- Violet Schram as Pequita
- H.B. Warner as Doctor West / Harry West
- Lloyd Whitlock as Jim Prince
- George Field as Miguel
- Edward Peil Sr.
- Marin Sais

== Bibliography ==
- Robert B. Connelly. The Silents: Silent Feature Films, 1910-36, Volume 40, Issue 2. December Press, 1998.
