= Carmen Phillips =

American actress (1888–1966)

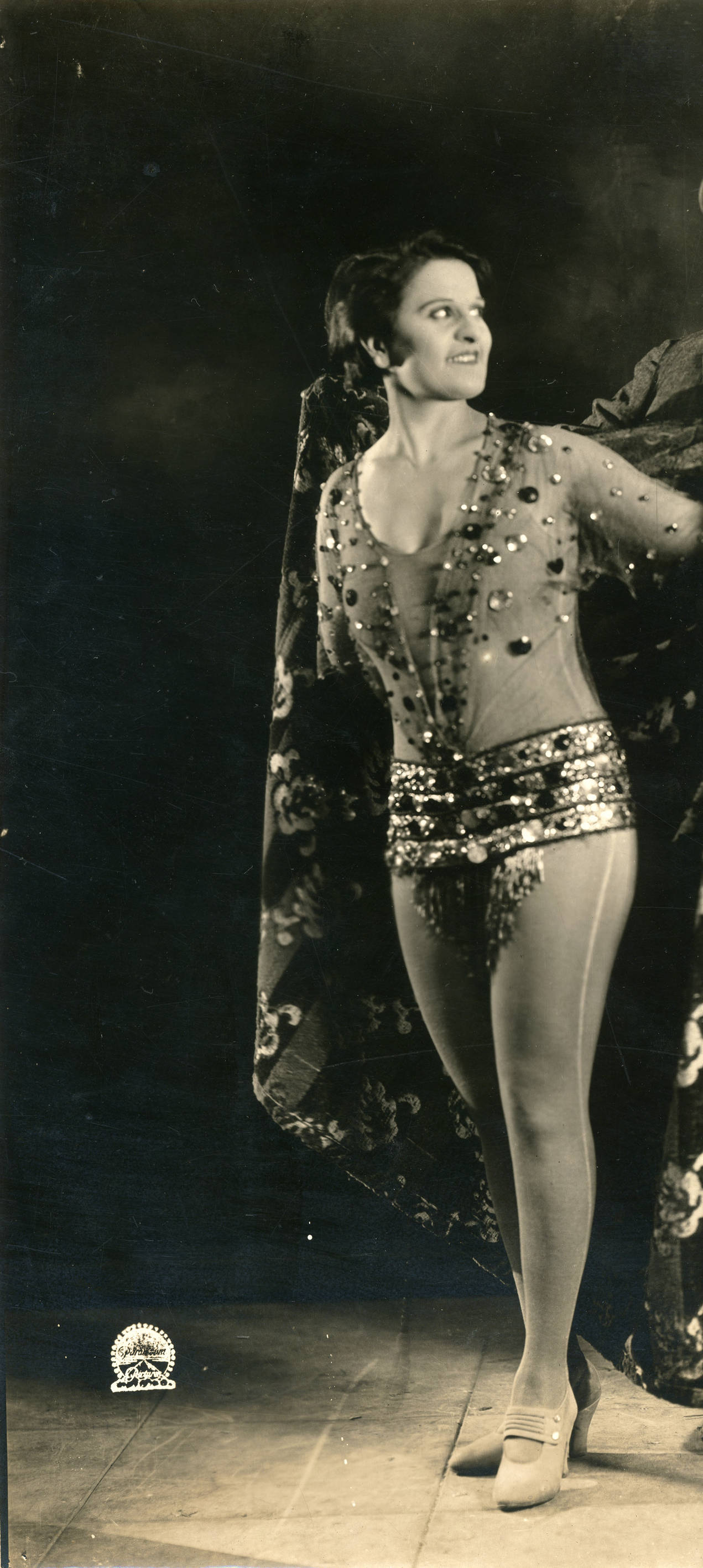
- Phillips in Fair Week (1924)
- Born: Anna Catherine Phillips; September 15, 1888; Oakland, California, U.S.
- Died: December 14, 1966 (aged 78); San Marino, California, U.S.
- Resting place: Live Oak Memorial Park, Monrovia, California
- Occupation: Actress
- Years active: 1910–1926
- Spouse: David C. Morin (1968-1968) divorce

Carmen Phillips (born Anna Catherine Phillips; September 15, 1888 – December 14, 1966) was an American actress of the silent era. She appeared in more than 60 films between 1914 and 1926, frequently as a "vamp".

== Biography ==
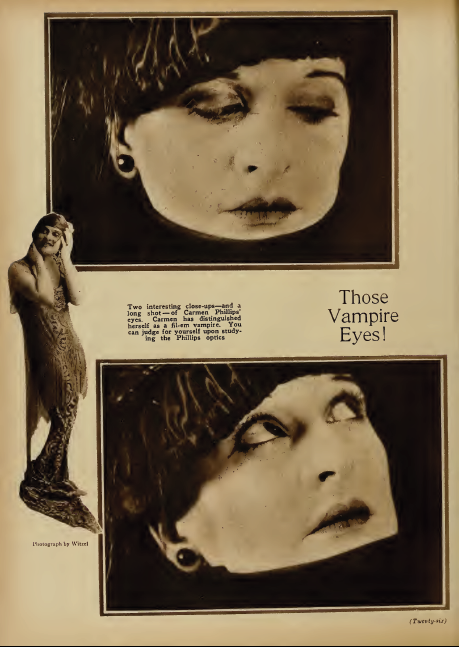
Phillips featured in the magazine Motion Picture Classic, 1920

A native Californian, Phillips performed on stage in musical comedies and as a Floradora Girl before films. Her stage name, "Carmen," came from her work as an "operatic contralto."

She died from complications of multiple sclerosis and her ashes are interred at Live Oak Memorial Park in Monrovia, California.

== Partial filmography ==
- The Pipes o' Pan (1914, Short) - Caprice
- Damon and Pythias (1914) - Extra (uncredited)
- Outside the Gates (1915, Short) - Carmela - a Dancing Girl
- Under the Crescent (1915) - Princess Uarda
- The New Adventures of Terence O'Rourke (1915) - Princess Constantine
- Lord John's Journal (1915) - Jenny
- The Grey Sisterhood (1916, Short) - Jenny
- Three Fingered Jenny (1916, Short) - Jenny
- The League of the Future (1916)
- Forbidden Paths (1917) - Benita Ramirez
- The Planter (1917) - Minor Role
- The Sunset Trail (1917) - Camilla Aiken
- Unclaimed Goods (1918) - Idaho Ina
- Tyrant Fear (1918) - Marie Courtot
- The Velvet Hand (1918) - Countess Michhetti
- The Cabaret Girl (1918) - Dolly
- Smiles (1919) - Madame Yelba
- Whitewashed Walls (1919) - Rosa
- The Home Town Girl (1919) - Nan Powderly
- The Man Who Turned White (1919) - Fanina
- The Pagan God (1919) - Tai Chen
- For A Woman's Honor (1919) - Valeska De Marsay
- The Hawk's Trail (1919) - Mimi
- The Great Air Robbery (1919) - Viola Matthews
- The Right of Way (1920) - Paulette Du Bois
- Mrs. Temple's Telegram (1920) - Pauline
- Always Audacious (1920) - Molly the Eel
- The Hope Diamond Mystery (1921) - Wanda Atherton / Miza
- All Soul's Eve (1921) - Olivia Larkin
- Too Much Married (1921) - Mrs. William Trevor
- The Fire Eater (1921) - Marie Roselli
- The Guttersnipe (1922) - Lady Clarissa
- The Heart Specialist (1922) - Grace Fitch
- Thirty Days (1922) - Carlotta
- The Gentleman from America (1923) - The Vamp
- Ashes of Vengeance (1923) - Marie
- Hollywood (1923) - Carmen Phillips
- The Fighting Coward (1924) - Mexico
- Fair Week (1924) - Madame Le Grande
- The Beautiful Sinner (1924) - Carmen De Santas
- A Cafe in Cairo (1924) - Gaza
- The Great Circus Mystery (1925) - Natchi
- A Six Shootin' Romance (1926) - Mrs. King (final film role)
