= Flashing Spurs =

1924 film

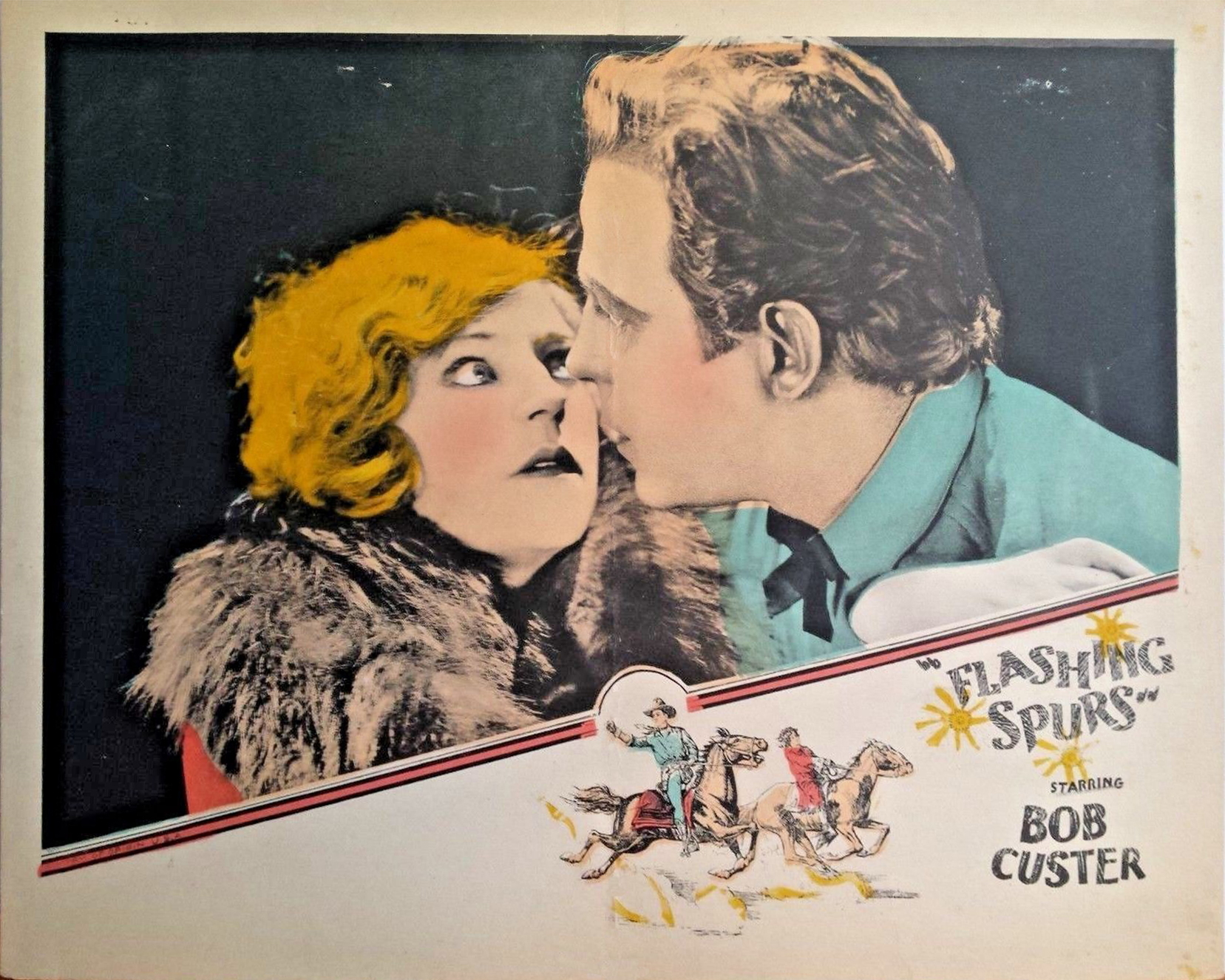
- Lobby card
- Directed by: B. Reeves Eason
- Written by: William Berke
- Produced by: Jesse J. Goldburg
- Starring: Bob Custer; Edward Coxen; Marguerite Clayton
- Cinematography: Walter L. Griffin
- Production company: Independent Pictures
- Distributed by: Film Booking Offices of America
- Release date: December 14, 1924
- Running time: 50 minutes
- Country: United States
- Languages: Silent; English intertitles

Flashing Spurs is a 1924 American silent Western film directed by B. Reeves Eason and starring Bob Custer, Edward Coxen, and Marguerite Clayton, who has a dual role of twin sisters. A Texas Ranger investigates a woman he believes is mixed up with a gang of outlaws.

== Plot ==
As described in a review in a film magazine, while following a clue, Sargent Stuart of the Rangers goes to the city and has a fight with two thugs, Frazier and Scarbee, and is overpowered. He makes an escape by crawling into the window of the room of Rena Holden, and is impressed by her. Returning later, he finds that she is gone and a letter indicates she is a crook, a member of Steve Clammert's gang, which is planning to rob miner John Holden. Stuart goes to the mine and sees Ruth Holden and, believing her to be her twin sister Rena, denounces her. Clammert's gang captures him and prepares to kill him when the side of a hill is blown up, but the explosive misfires and he survives. John and Rena, who is masquerading as Ruth, rescue him, and she confesses the plot. They arrive at Clammert's shack in time to rescue Ruth from an attack by Clammert, but Rena is injured during the fight. John forgives Rena, and when she recovers she agrees to become Mrs. Stuart.

== Cast ==
- Bob Custer as Ranger Sgt. Stuart
- Edward Coxen as Steve Clammert
- Marguerite Clayton as Ruth Holden / Rena Holden
- Joseph Bennett as Butch Frazier
- William T. Hayes as Scarbee
- William Malan as John Holden
- Andrew Waldron as Flynn
- Park Frame as Bill Carbee

== Preservation ==
With no prints of Flashing Spurs located in any film archives, it is a lost film.

== Bibliography ==
- Langman, Larry. A Guide to Silent Westerns. Greenwood Publishing Group, 1992.
