= Robert Harley (mathematician) =

Robert Harley (23 January 1828 – 26 July 1910) was an English Congregational minister and mathematician.

== Life ==
Born in Liverpool on 23 January 1828, he was third son of Robert Harley by his wife Mary, daughter of William Stevenson, and niece of General Stevenson of Ayr.. The father, after a career as a merchant, became a minister of the Wesleyan Methodist Association. Harley's mathematical aptitude developed at school in Blackburn under William Hoole, and age 16 he was appointed to a mathematical mastership at Seacombe, near Liverpool, returning later to teach at Blackburn.

He was elected to corresponding membership of the Manchester Literary and Philosophical Society on 30 April 1850.

In 1854 Harley entered the Congregational ministry, and was at Brighouse, Yorkshire, until 1868, after a time also filling the chair of mathematics and logic at Airedale College from 1864 to 1868. In 1863 he was admitted Fellow of the Royal Society. He acted as secretary of the A section of the British Association at meetings at Norwich (1868) and Edinburgh (1871); and was a vice-president of the meetings at Bradford (1873), Bath (1888), and Cardiff (1891).

From 1868 to 1872 he was pastor of the oldest Congregational church in Leicester, and from 1872 to 1881 was vice-principal of Mill Hill School, where he officiated in the chapel. At Mill Hill he was instrumental in erecting a public lecture hall for total abstinence talks as well as popular entertainment and instruction. From 1882 to 1885 he was principal of Huddersfield College, and from 1886 to 1890 minister of the Congregational church in Oxford, where he was made hon. M.A. in 1886.

Having taken a ministerial appointment in Australia, Harley was pastor of Heath Church, Halifax, from 1892 until 1895, when he retired and settled at Forest Hill, near London. He continued to preach in London and the provinces, and as a temperance advocate.

Harley died at Rosslyn, Westbourne Road, Forest Hill, on 26 July 1910, and was buried in Ladywell cemetery.

== Works ==
Throughout his career mathematics remained a major interest for Harley. He spent time on the theory of equations, especially the theory of the general equation of the fifth degree. His conclusions, which were published in Memoirs of the Manchester Lit. and Phil. Soc 1860, xv. 172–219, were independently reached at the same time by Sir James Cockle. Harley's two further papers on the Theory of Quintics and an exposition of Cockle's method of symmetric products in Phil. Trans. (1860) attracted the attention of Arthur Cayley, who carried the research further.

Harley failed to complete the treatise on quintics which he had begun, but continued to publish. A sketch of the life and work of George Boole appeared in the British Quarterly Review (July 1866), and a memoir of his friend, Sir James Cockle, is in the Proceedings of the Royal Society, vol. lix.

== Family ==
In 1854 Harley married Sara, daughter of James Stroyan of Wigan; she died in 1905. Upon his death he was survived by two sons and a daughter.

Their son Harold Harley (1860–1937), using the pen name Mark Ambient, was a dramatist and librettist of musical comedies.

== Notes ==
Attribution

This article incorporates text from a publication now in the public domain: Lee, Sidney, ed. (1912). "Harley, Robert". Dictionary of National Biography (2nd supplement). Vol. 2. London: Smith, Elder & Co.
