= Lounge lizard =

American slang term

A lounge lizard is a man who frequents social establishments with the intention of seducing a woman with his flattery and deceptive charm. The term is reported to have arisen around 1915 in New York. A 1931 book described them as men "[in] the habit of lounging in different dance resorts from tea time on, on a chance of picking up a few dollars; or they might be habitués of the place or of an outer room, described as a 'lounge', for the purpose of picking up girls and women. In Europe, he subsequently evolved into what is now known as the gigolo."

== Examples ==
In the 1919 Charlie Chaplin film Sunnyside the term appears as a title card, describing a group of men reading newspapers in a hotel lobby.

In Buster Keaton's 1924 film Sherlock Jr., Keaton plays a projectionist at a movie theater where the movie showing is Hearts & Pearls or The Lounge Lizard's Lost Love. The movie within a movie has a character who is good looking and well dressed who is romantically involved with a wealthy young woman.

In the first story of Agatha Christie’s Parker Pyne Investigates, ‘The Case of the Middle-Aged Wife’, the character of Claude Luttrell is referred to as a “lounge lizard”.

== See also ==
- Leisure Suit Larry in the Land of the Lounge Lizards
