= The Lost Paradise (1914 film) =

1914 film by J. Searle Dawley

- Directed by: J. Searle Dawley
- Written by: Henry Churchill de Mille; Ludwig Fulda
- Starring: H. B. Warner; Catherine Carter; Mark Price; Arthur Hoops; Rita Stan; Amy Summers; Phillips Tead
- Cinematography: H. Lyman Broening; Harry Leslie Keepers
- Production company: Famous Players Film Company
- Distributed by: Paramount Pictures
- Release date: September 1, 1914
- Country: United States
- Language: English

The Lost Paradise is a 1914 American silent drama film directed by J. Searle Dawley and written by Henry C. DeMille and Ludwig Fulda. The film stars H. B. Warner, Catherine Carter, Mark Price, Arthur Hoops, Rita Stan, Amy Summers and Phillips Tead. The film was released on September 1, 1914, by Paramount Pictures.

== Cast ==
- H. B. Warner as Reuben Warren
- Catherine Carter as Margaret Knowlton
- Mark Price as Andrew Knowlton
- Arthur Hoops as Ralph Standish
- Rita Stan as Nell
- Amy Summers as 'Cinders'
- Phillips Tead as Billy Hopkins
- Trixie Jennery as Kate
- Wellington A. Playter as Schwartz
- Augustus Balfour as Joe Barrett
- Marcus Moriarity as Old Bensel

== Preservation ==
With no holdings located in archives, The Lost Paradise is considered a lost film.
