= Fair Week =

1924 film by Rob Wagner

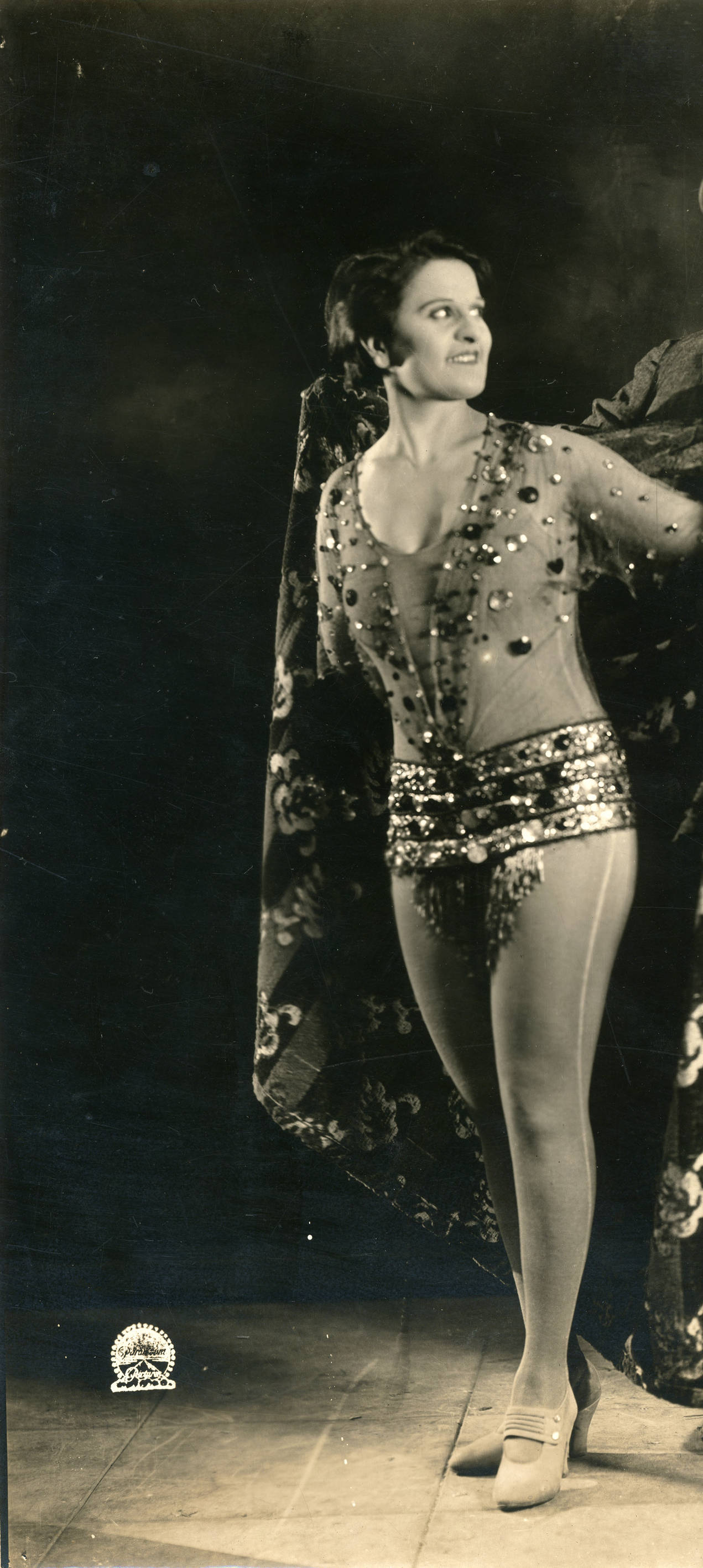
- Carmen Phillips in the film
- Directed by: Rob Wagner
- Screenplay by: Thomas J. Geraghty
- Story by: Walter Woods
- Produced by: Jesse L. Lasky; Adolph Zukor
- Starring: Walter Hiers; Constance Wilson; Carmen Phillips; J. Farrell MacDonald; Bobbie Mack; Mary Jane Irving
- Cinematography: Bert Baldridge
- Production company: Famous Players–Lasky Corporation
- Distributed by: Paramount Pictures
- Release date: March 16, 1924
- Running time: 50 minutes
- Country: United States
- Language: Silent (English intertitles)

Fair Week is a 1924 American silent comedy film directed by Rob Wagner and written by Thomas J. Geraghty and Walter Woods. The film stars Walter Hiers, Constance Wilson, Carmen Phillips, J. Farrell MacDonald, Bobbie Mack, and Mary Jane Irving. The film was released on March 16, 1924, by Paramount Pictures.

== Plot ==
As described in a film magazine review, Slim Swasey of Rome, Missouri, is the guardian of Tinkle, a six-year-old girl deserted by some member of a traveling show. During Fair Week balloonist Madame Le Grande arrives. Isadore Kelly and 'Sure Thing' Sherman are crooks and plan to rob the town bank. When the balloon ascends in a sudden flight, Tinkle is its only passenger, but Slim rushes to the rescue with some acrobatic stunts. Later, Slim foils the scheme of the crooks and wins the affections of Ollie Remus, the young woman that he loves. Madame Le Grande turns out to be Tinkle's mother.

== Cast ==
- Walter Hiers as Slim Swasey
- Constance Wilson as Ollie Remus
- Carmen Phillips as Madame Le Grande
- J. Farrell MacDonald as Jasper Remus
- Bobbie Mack as Dan Hogue
- Mary Jane Irving as Tinkle
- Earl Metcalfe as 'Sure Thing' Sherman
- Knute Erickson as Isadore Kelly
- Jane Keckley as Mary Ellen Allen

Constance Wilson was the sister of actress Lois Wilson.

== Preservation ==
A print of Fair Week survives in the Gosfilmofond film archive near Moscow, Russia.
