= Charles Warner =

English stage actor

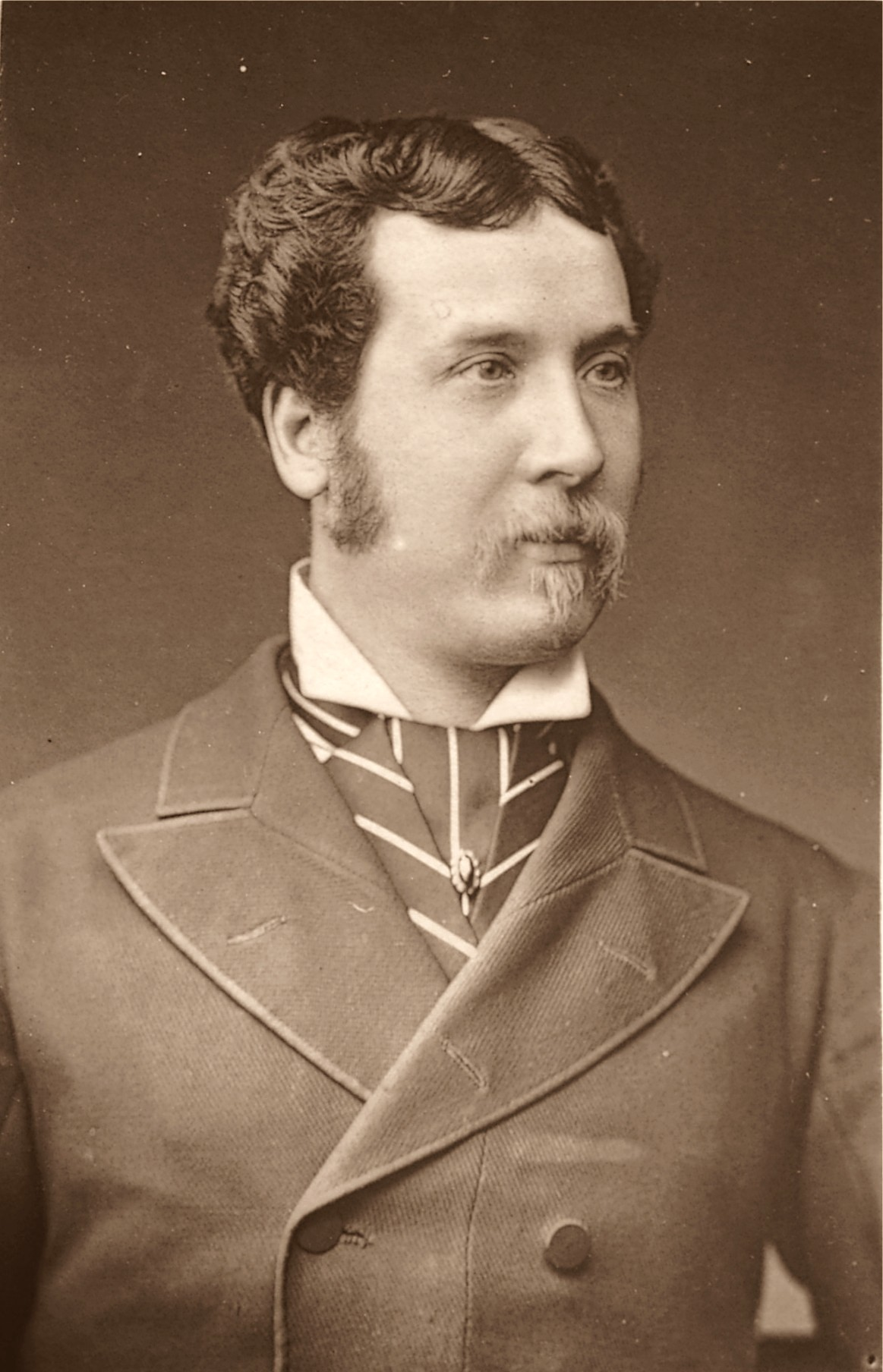
- Portrait of Charles Warner (photographed in about 1876)
- Born: Charles John Lickfold; 10 October 1846; Kensington, London, England
- Died: 11 February 1909 (aged 62); New York City, US
- Occupation: actor
- Spouse: Fanny Hards
- Parent(s): James Lickfold & Hannah (née Holland)

Signature
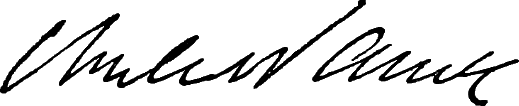

Charles John Warner (né Lickfold, 10 October 1846 – 11 February 1909) was an English stage actor whose career of over forty years spanned the Victorian and Edwardian eras. Warner performed in a variety of styles, from Shakespeare's plays to comedies, but he was best known for his dramatic roles and the emotional intensity of his performances. His most famous character was the alcoholic 'Coupeau' in Charles Reade's melodrama Drink (based on Émile Zola's novel, L'Assommoir), a part that the actor performed many times during his career. Warner performed in the principal theatres in London during the period 1864 to 1887. He had a successful tour of Australia and New Zealand from December 1887 to June 1890, after which he returned to England. In 1906 Warner travelled to New York where he appeared on stage in several productions. In February 1909 he committed suicide in his Manhattan hotel room.

== Biography ==
=== Early years ===
Charles John Lickfold was born on 10 October 1846 in the central London district of Kensington, the third child of James Lickfold and Hannah (née Holland). His father worked as a straw-hat maker and seller. Lickfold was educated at Westbury College in the north London suburb of Highgate.

Lickfold made his first appearance on the stage in 1861, aged fifteen, at a special performance at Windsor Castle before Queen Victoria, performing as a page in Edward Bulwer-Lytton's historical drama, Richelieu (with the veteran actor Samuel Phelps in the lead role).

Lickfold worked briefly in the office of his uncle, an architect. In 1863, aged seventeen, he left that employment and his home, determined to pursue a theatrical career. Lickford had secured a position as a "utilitarian" actor in a theatre company under the management of James Rogers, based in the provincial town of Hanley in Staffordshire. When he left home Lickfold was accompanied by his sister, "who had got wind of my intention and insisted on going with me". The company of actors worked "the Hanley, Leicester, Lichfield, and Worcester circuit", performing dramas such as The Castle Spectre and The Mysteries of Paris. Lickfold remained with the company for just under a year, playing two parts a night in a constant turn-over of productions. He later remarked: "It was there that I really learned my profession, the continual change of plays ensuring versalitity".

In 1864 Lickfold briefly joined Henry Nye Chart's company in Brighton. Soon afterwards, however, he was offered the opportunity to appear on the stage in London.

=== The London stage ===
At some point early in his career Lickfold adopted the stage name of 'Charles Warner', the name by which he was known for the rest of his life. In 1864 Warner made his debut on the London stage as 'Benvolio' in Romeo and Juliet at the Princess' Theatre in Oxford street.

In 1866 Warner was engaged for a three-year period by F. B. Chatterton at the Theatre Royal in Drury Lane in London, performing in Shakesperean revivals with Samuel Phelps. It was Phelps that became the young actor's mentor; as Warner later stated: "the late Samuel Phelps... really took me in hand, and helped me to achieve the position which I now hold".

Charles Lickfold and Fanny Hards were married on 17 December 1866 in the parish church at Hampstead. The couple had two children, Grace (born in 1870 at Paddington) and Henry (born in 1875 at St Johns Wood). Both children followed their father's profession as actors.

In about 1870 Charles Warner joined the company at the Olympic Theatre in Drury Lane. His roles there included 'Charley Burridge' in H. J. Byron's Daisy Farm.

From 1872 Warner joined the company at the Lyceum Theatre, then under the management of H. L. Bateman, where he remained for two years. At the Lyceum he succeeded Henry Irving in the role of 'Alfred Jingle' in Pickwick (James Albery's stage adaptation of The Pickwick Papers). Amongst his other roles at the Lyceum, Warner also played the role of 'Orpheus' in Euripides' Medea.

In about 1874 Warner joined the company of the Vaudeville Theatre in London's West End and "attracted favorable notice there by his painstaking acting in various parts". His roles at the Vaudeville included 'Mr. Puff' in a revival of The Critic by Richard Brinsley Sheridan, 'Charles Surface' in Sheridan's The School for Scandal and 'Harry Dornton' in Thomas Holcroft's The Road to Ruin. In 1875 Charles Warner played the part of 'Charles Middlewick' for 700 nights in the highly successful comedy, H. J. Byron's Our Boys. At the Vaudeville he also appeared in Boucicault's Old Heads and Young Hearts ("a charming comedy") and as 'Charles Courtley' in London Assurance (that played for 400 nights).

Warner then went to the Haymarket Theatre Royal for a year, playing in leading roles opposite Adelaide Neilson.

In 1878 Warner was engaged at the Princess' Theatre by Walter Gooch, where he opened as 'Tom Robinson' in a revival of Charles Reade's It's Never Too Late to Mend, a production which played "for nearly 300 nights". He also appeared as 'Henry Shore' in the drama, Jane Shore by W. G. Wills.

=== Drink ===
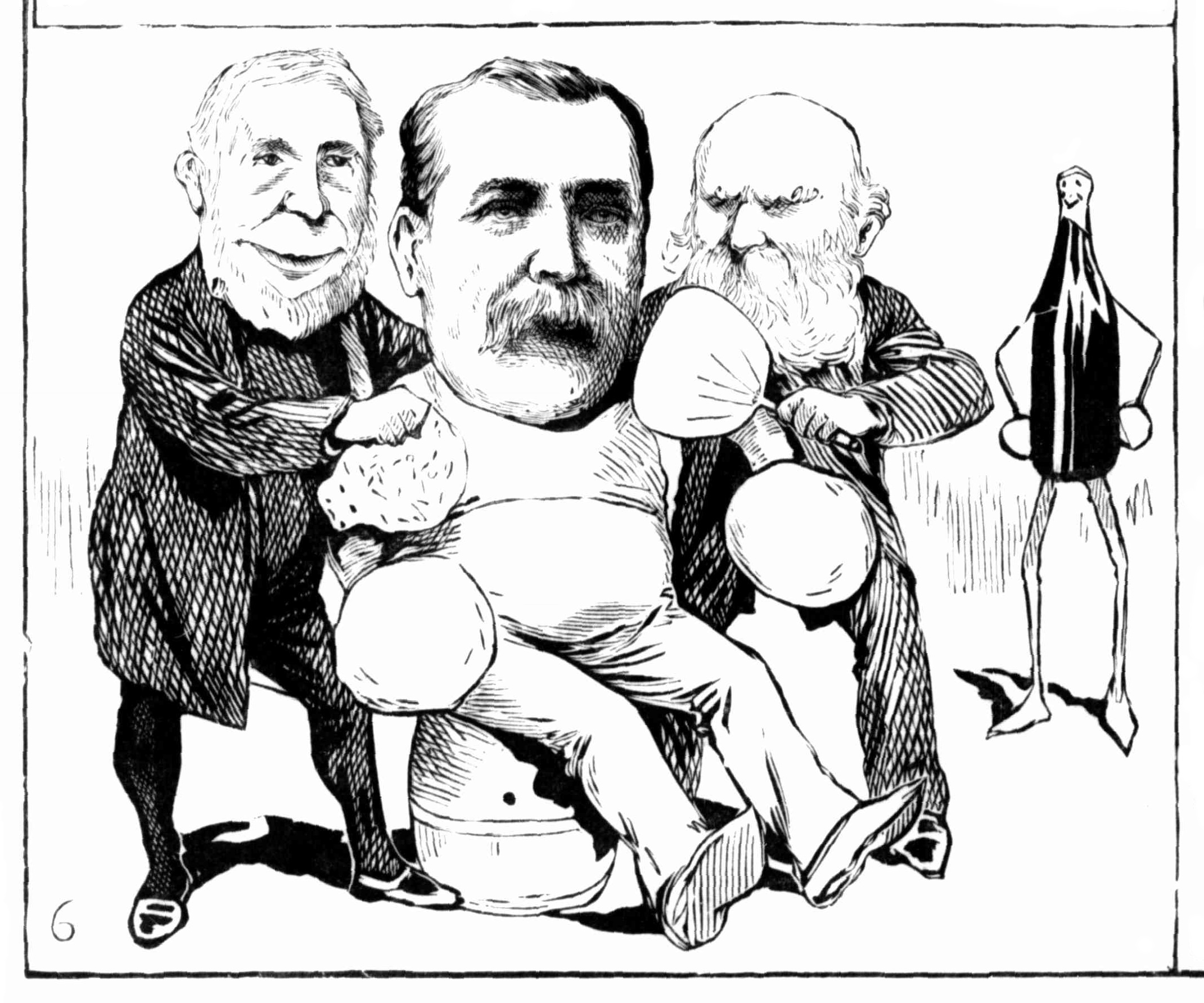
"What we hope to see. Church and Teetotalism assisting Charles Warner in his bottle-battle. If they are consistent they will back the player up, for once in their lives." (Melbourne Punch, 23 February 1888)

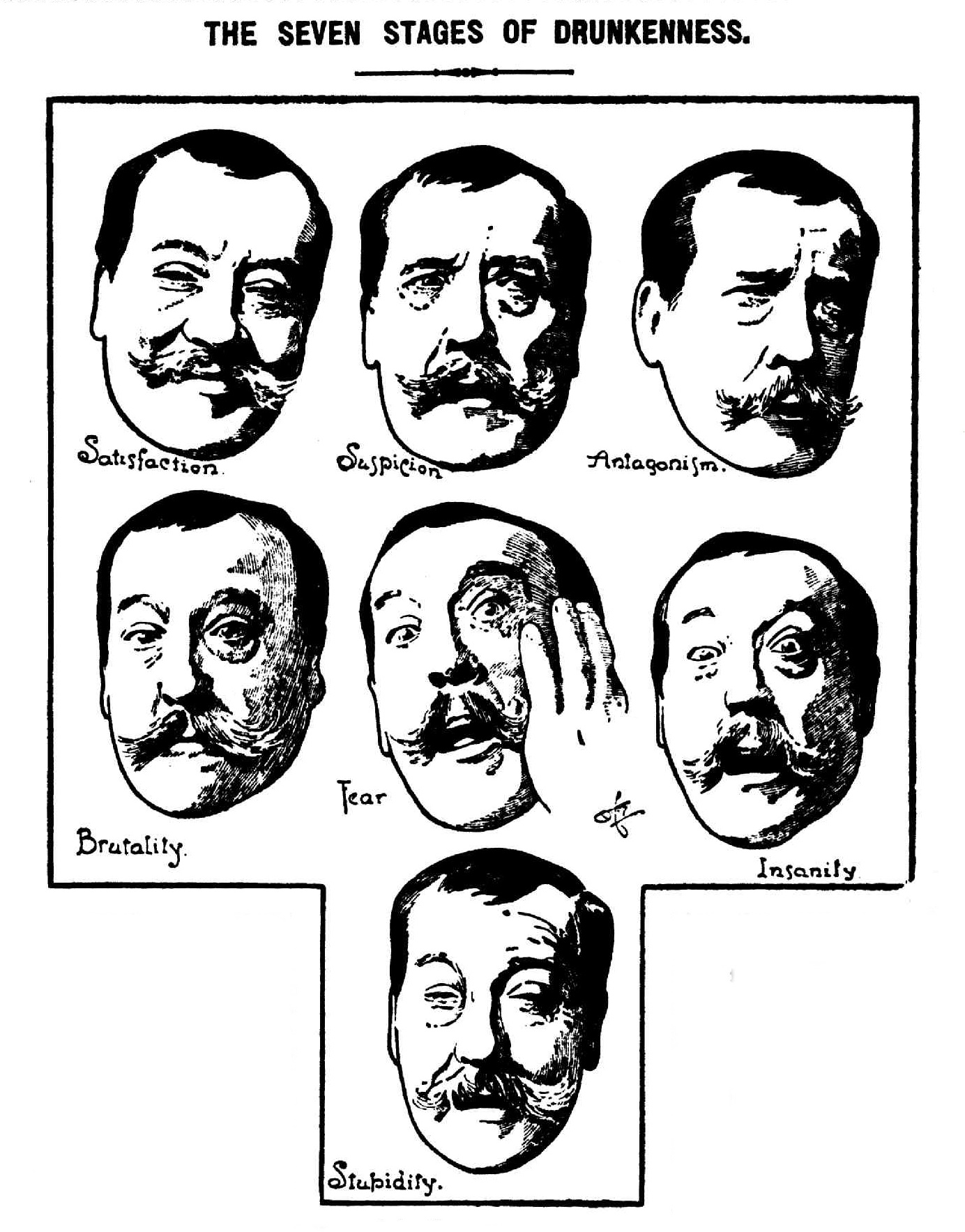
"The seven stages of drunkenness", inspired by Charles Warner's role in Drink (published in The World's News, 7 November 1903)

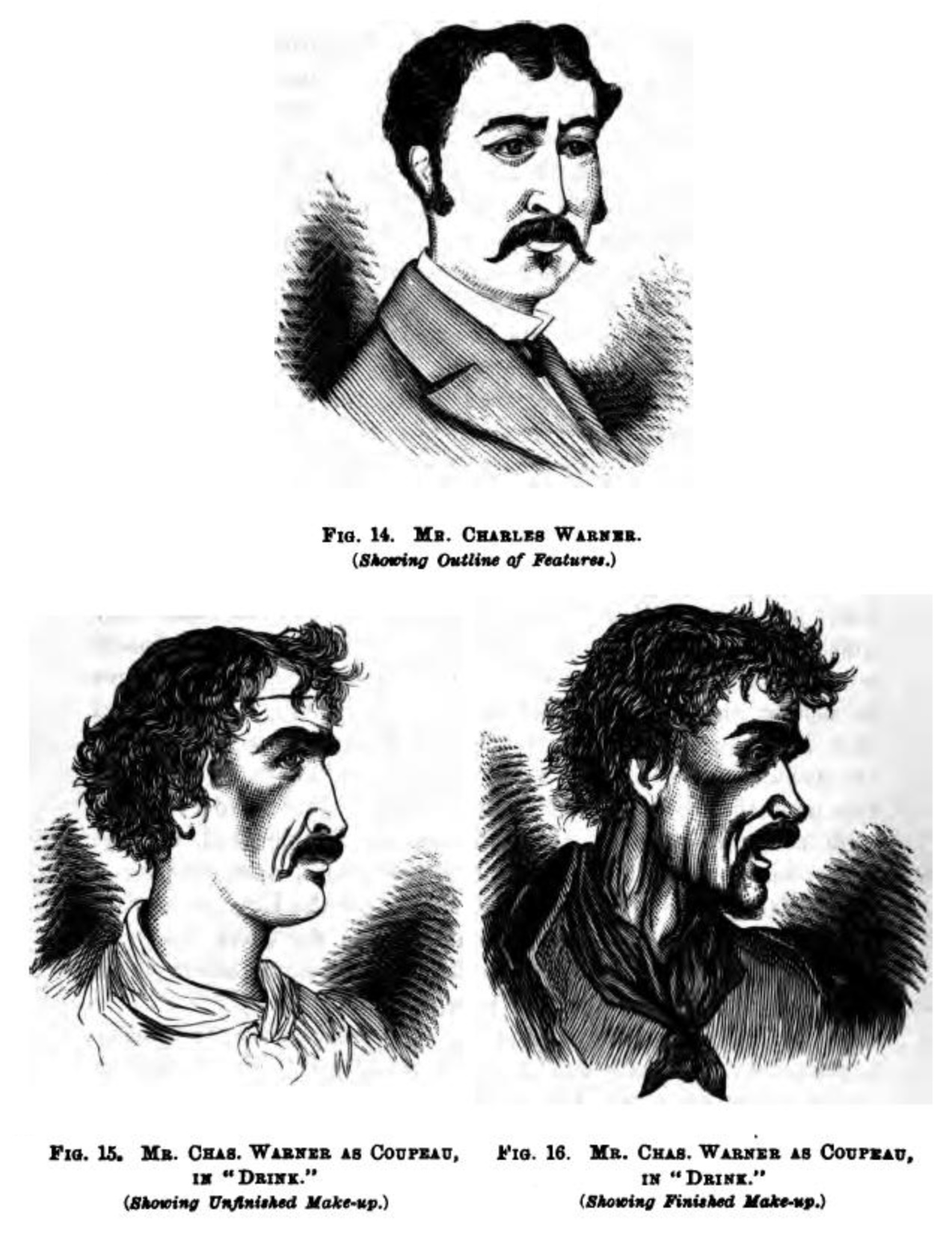
Warner's stage make-up for the role of Coupeau in Drink; from Theatricals and Tableaux Vivants for Amateurs by Charles Harrison (1882)

It was Warner's role as "Coupeau" in Charles Reade's Drink that "made his reputation as a great melodramatic actor". Drink was a play based on Émile Zola's novel, L'Assommoir, and adapted by Reade from the French play of the same name as Zola's novel. Drink premiered at the Princess' Theatre on 2 June 1879. The drama was described as being mounted "with all the scenery and surprising effects" that characterised the production of the original French play at the Théâtre de l'Ambigu-Comique in Paris.

Warner's role involved a "realistic presentment of the death of the wretched Coupeau from delirium tremens". He studied the causes and symptoms of the condition, "so that no element of reality should be wanting" in his performance. One London newspaper described that section of the play as "the most terrible scene ever presented on the English stage". In 1909 after Warner's suicide in New York the actor Gordon Bailey, who had played alongside him in Drink, "stated that after the performance Mr. Warner was completely broken up, and that the passion and violence he put into his acting was enough to unhinge any brain". It was said that the final scene in Drink was so "exceedingly exacting" for the actor that Warner "would totter off the stage to his dressing-room, trembling, shaken as by a palsy, and bathed in perspiration".

Warner played the role of Coupeau at the Princess' Theatre "for a year and three months without cessation". He later played it in revivals in London at the Adelphi, Princess' and Surrey theatres, and the Standard Theatre in Shoreditch (in London's East End). At the Standard the play averaged £1,200 a week for seven weeks "at cheap prices... not even the pantomime there ever realised such a sum".

At the time of his death in 1909 it was estimated that Warner had performed the role of Coupeau in Drink "about 3,000 times" in various parts of the world. By the time of his extended tour of Australia and New Zealand in the late 1880s, during which the actor performed the role of Coupeau on many occasions, there was a standing joke that 'Warner had taken to Drink again'.

=== Sadler's Wells Theatre ===
In 1880 Walter Gooch offered Warner a three-year engagement at the Princess' Theatre when it re-opened after a complete rebuild. At about the same time the renowned American Shakespearean actor Edwin Booth announced his intention to appear in London and Gooch also engaged him for six months. This caused a problem, with Booth refusing to share the stage with the English actor (Warner later claimed he had been willing to allow Booth his choice of roles, but the American declined). The Princess' Theatre re-opened in November 1880, with Booth and his company in a production of Hamlet. Rather than face the prospect of being "shelved for several months", Warner joined the company at the Sadler's Wells Theatre, in the Clerkenwell district of central London.

Warner remained at the Sadler's Wells Theatre for nine months, where he played a range of Shakespearean characters such as 'Othello' and 'Macbeth', as well as appearing in other plays (including revivals of The School for Scandal and The Road to Ruin). In late-January 1881 Warner performed as 'Walter Lee' in Henry Pettitt's drama, Taken from Life.

Warner's versatility as an actor was considered to be one of his strengths. In a summary of the actor's career, written in 1882, the writer George Wilman commented on Warner's ability to "play the hero of a classical piece one night, and turn the next to a character demanding all the sprightliness, wit and buoyancy of manner that are the indispensable attainments of a refined low comedian".

=== Adelphi Theatre ===
Warner directed productions and played a series of melodramatic roles at the Adelphi Theatre from March 1881 to June 1885.

- In March 1881 Warner directed an adaption of Jules Verne's Michael Strogoff and also played the title role. On opening night he was wounded in the hand during a duel "fought with a scimitar dangerously and unnecessarily sharp". The production was a success, playing for 100 performances.
- During August 1881 Warner directed a revival of Dion Boucicault's Janet Pride, also playing 'Richard Pride' in the production.
- It's Never Too Late to Mend by Charles Reade opened in September 1881, with Warner in the role of 'Tom Robinson'.
- Taken from Life by Henry Pettitt, which opened on 31 December 1881, was directed by Warner, who also had the lead role of 'Walter Lee' in the production.
- In August 1882 a revival of Drink opened at the Adelphi, with Warner reprising his highly regarded performance as 'Coupeau'.
- In January 1883 Warner played the lead role in a revival of Dora, Reade's adaption of Tennyson's poem.
- The "sensational melodrama" Storm-Beaten opened in March 1883, with Warner directing and playing the role of 'Christian Christianson'.
- The Streets of London written by Dion Boucicault, from July to October 1883 with Warner in the role of 'Badger'.
- From October 1883 to March 1885 Warner played 'Ned Drayton' in the drama, In the Ranks (written by Henry Pettitt and George R. Sims), a play that ran "for nearly 500 consecutive nights". After the opening night Warner was described as "the typical hero of the Adelphi romance" who "seemed to carry the play on his shoulders to success".
- The Last Chance written by George R. Sims, from April to June 1885 with Warner in the role of 'Frank Daryll'.

After The Last Chance finished in June 1885, Warner left the Adelphi Theatre after a commitment that spanned five seasons, and briefly joined the company at the Olympic Theatre.

=== Vaudeville and Princess' Theatres ===
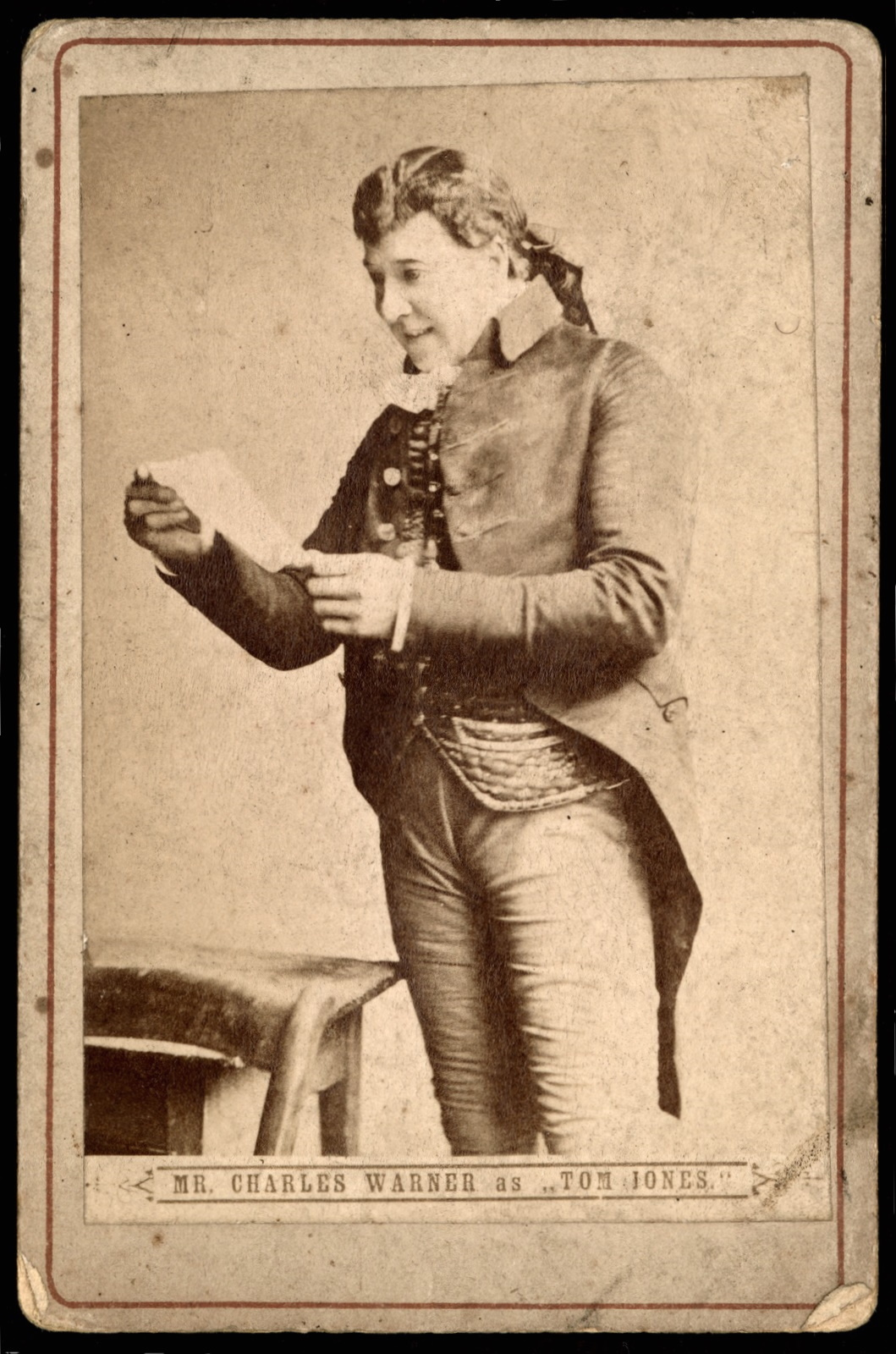
Charles Warner in the role of Tom Jones

In 1886 Warner returned to the Vaudeville Theatre, managed by his friend Tom Thorne, where he performed in The Road to Ruin. This was followed by Robert Buchanan's Sophia (an adaption of Fielding's Tom Jones) in which Warner played the role of 'Tom Jones'. Sophia was highly successful, with a run of "nearly 600 nights".

In December 1886 Warner returned to the Princess' Theatre, where he opened in H. A. Jones' The Noble Vagabond. From April 1887 he performed as 'Colonel Charles Prescott' in Held by the Enemy, a Civil War drama by the American playwright William Gillette.

While he was at the Princess Theatre Warner met George Musgrove (representing the Australian theatrical management partnership of Williamson, Garner and Musgrove). In the Green Room Club in London Musgrove offered the actor "an engagement to come to Australia", which he readily accepted. As soon as the deal was completed Musgrove cabled his partners in Australia to "keep open Melbourne in February for Charles Warner". At that stage Warner's engagement was to be for six weeks only.

A farewell matinee benefit for Charles Warner was held at the Theatre Royal in Drury Lane on 9 December 1887, on the occasion of his impending departure for Australia. The event, a series of performances and songs, involved "all the principal London artists" who had donated their services to the benefit. Warner was involved in several of the sequences, including the second act of Romeo and Juliet (with William Terriss, Leonard Boyne and his daughter Grace Warner in her stage début). Warner also performed with others in the sixth act of Drink.

Prior to his departure from England, Warner "was entertained... at a luncheon" at the Hotel Metropole "by a number of Australian colonists" resident in London.

=== Australia ===
Warner and his daughter Grace departed from London on 2 January 1888 aboard the R.M.S.S. Victoria of the P. and O. Company's line. The voyage, via Aden and Colombo, took 35 days, arriving in Melbourne on 6 February. During the trip various amusements (such as "fancy dress balls, concerts, negro minstrelsy, tableaux vivants, athletic sports, and histrionic entertainments") were organised by the passengers "to make their time pass merrily, and sometimes instructively". On the voyage Warner and his daughter performed the balcony scene from Romeo and Juliet; a scene from Hamlet was also staged, in which a passenger, Miss Chirnside, took on the role of Ophelia. After his arrival in Melbourne, Warner wrote a letter to the editor of The Argus newspaper regarding the voyage. He admitted that "it was almost with dread, amounting to positive horror" that he undertook "so long a sea voyage", not having beforehand "travelled further than Paris and Germany". However, once he had settled aboard the vessel, Warner wrote that his "pleasure and delight grew as the voyage progressed".

On Saturday, 18 February 1888, Charles Warner made his début on the Australian stage at Melbourne's Theatre Royal in Drink, the play "in which he achieved his great London success nearly nine years ago". When the English actor first appeared on stage, "the storm of applause which broke from all parts of the house arrested the progress of the piece for some little time". Warner's share of the takings for his first week of performances in Melbourne was £500. He later remarked that the production of Drink in Melbourne was staged "as lavishly as in London" and he paid "a warm tribute to the discriminating enthusiasm of the typical colonial audience". The actor was so pleased with his reception in Melbourne that he agreed to the proposal by Williamson, Garner and Musgrove to extend his engagement from six weeks to sixteen. In June 1888 Warner wrote: "Since my arrival the few spare moments that I have been able to snatch from rehearsals I have devoted to the kindly invitations of my many new friends in Melbourne, and I say it from my heart, that a more congenial, delightful, and hospitable people it would be impossible to encounter".

From February to June 1888 Williamson, Garner and Musgrove presented Warner to the Melbourne audiences in a number of the roles for which he was well-known (at both the Theatre Royal and the New Princess' Theatre). The productions staged in Melbourne during that period included Hamlet, School for Scandal, The Lady of Lyons and London Assurance.

On 15 June 1888 a special 'Shakespearean night' was presented at the Princess's Theatre marking the close of Warner's Melbourne season. During the evening Warner played the characters of Hamlet, Romeo, Shylock and Othello in selected scenes from Shakespeare's plays.

In June 1888 Warner and his company travelled to Adelaide for a month-long season at the Theatre Royal, during which they presented "a number of theatrical treats" to the Adelaide playgoers. The Adelaide season also proved to be lucrative. The three nights of Hamlet alone returned £600. From Adelaide Warner and his company travelled to Sydney where they opened on 28 July with Drink at the Theatre Royal. In mid-August a production of The Lady of Lyons was staged, with Warner in the role of 'Claude Melnotte'. A clash with the touring London Gaiety Company in August prompted a week of performances in Newcastle, where Warner and his company played "to the largest audiences on record in that city".

After a successful Sydney season Warner returned to Melbourne to appear in the first Australian production of Hands Across the Sea, a play specially written for Warner's Australian tour by Henry Pettitt, which opened at the Theatre Royal on 29 September 1888. The play was highly successful, playing for twelve weeks in Melbourne "to the highest receipts ever known in the colonies". For a period of just seven performances, "the figures were up to £1,800". In late-December Hands Across the Sea opened at Sydney's Theatre Royal.

In mid-February 1889 the drama Captain Swift opened at Sydney's Theatre Royal, with Warner in the title role and Gracie Warner also in the cast. he play was written by C. Haddon Chambers, a London-based dramatist who had been born in Sydney. The Sydney season of Captain Swift was not considered a success, with audience numbers down and the play being the subject of criticism in the local press.

Warner and his company arrived in Brisbane in mid-April 1889. During a successful six-week season at Brisbane's Opera House the company produced eleven different plays. The receipts for the opening week totalled £1,050. In contrast to its Sydney performances, Captain Swift played to full houses in Brisbane. From Brisbane Warner's company travelled to Adelaide for a "most brilliant and successful" five-week season (from 10 June to mid-July 1889) at the Theatre Royal.

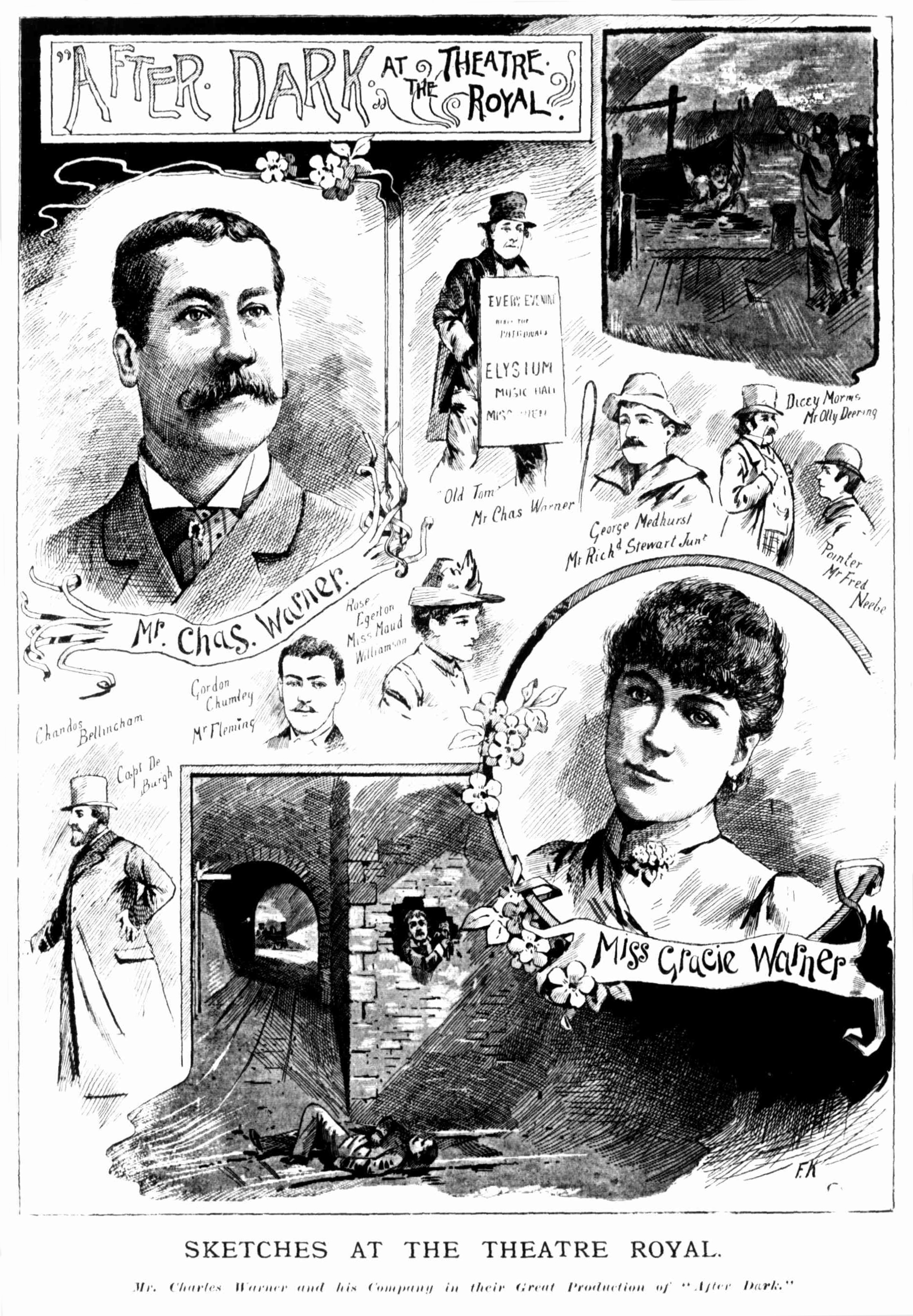
"Sketches at the Theatre Royal", illustrations from the production of After Dark by Charles Warner and his Company (published in Melbourne Punch, 15 May 1890)

After the Adelaide season had finished Warner returned to Melbourne. The Williamson, Garner and Musgrove Dramatic Company that had been supporting Warner was disbanded and Warner set about forming and rehearsing a new company (with some members common to both).

In August 1889 a popular English actress named Jennie Lee, who had been engaged by Williamson, Garner and Musgrove, was performing in The Grasshopper at Melbourne's Princess' Theatre. On 13 August she was "suddenly taken ill" and her understudy played her part that evening. Miss Lee was diagnosed with "a severe bronchial attack", which placed her management in a dilemma, as it was impractical for her understudy to replace the popular actress for the required period of recovery. Williamson, Garner and Musgrove had contemplated closing the theatre, but Warner rescued the situation by offering to perform Captain Swift at the Princess' Theatre for two weeks, despite a previous arrangement to perform with his new company at Ballarat during that period. Warner placed a notice in The Ballarat Star on 20 August, explaining "the reason of his not appearing as announced" and expressing his intention to visit Ballarat at a later date "in order not to disappoint the public". Williamson, Garner and Musgrove sent a company to Ballarat to fulfil Warner's commitments there, opening with Hands Across the Sea at the Academy of Music with J. H. Clyndes, a recently arrived English actor, replacing Warner in the male lead role. Despite all the elaborate arrangements, the staging of Captain Swift at the Princess' Theatre in Melbourne proved to be a "financial failure" due to poor attendances during the fortnight.

In early September 1889 Warner and his company played a short season at the Royal Princess Theatre in Sandhurst (Bendigo), performing productions such as Hands Across the Sea, Drink, Dora, the comedy The Barrister and The Lady of Lyons. Later in the month Warner's company commenced a tour of Tasmania, beginning in Launceston and finishing on 26 September at Hobart.

On 10 October 1889 Warner and his company commenced a tour of New Zealand at Dunedin, opening with Hands Across the Sea at the Princess Theatre. They also performed at Christchurch, Wellington and Auckland. It was reported that Charles Warner cleared £3,000 from his tour of New Zealand.

After his successful tour of New Zealand, Warner appeared in a revival of Hands Across the Sea at the Theatre Royal in Melbourne in February 1890. In May 1890 Warner played 'Old Tom' in the revival of Dion Boucicault's melodrama, After Dark, at Melbourne's Theatre Royal.

In late-June 1890 Warner and his daughter Gracie featured in three farewell performances of Hamlet at the Theatre Royal in Adelaide, supported by the MacMahon Dramatic Company. In early July they departed for England aboard the R.M.S. Orizaba. Warner had been initially engaged for a six-week tour of Australia, soon afterwards extended to sixteen weeks, but he ended up remaining in the country for two years and six months. Warner's tour of Australia was reported to have been highly profitable (estimated at between twenty and thirty-five thousand pounds), but Warner's share was "unluckily lost in mining speculations".

=== Return to England ===
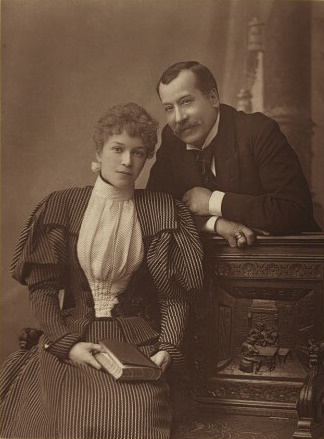
Grace Warner (Mrs. Franklin McLeay) and her father, Charles Warner (photograph published in June 1896)

After his return to England Warner performed in A Million of Money at Drury Lane, a spectacular melodrama by Augustus Harris and Henry Pettitt described as "an incoherent nightmare of former Drury-lane dramas". After his return from Australia the actor was reported to be "the same as ever, cheery, boisterous, loud-voiced, strong-lunged". Later Warner revived roles for which he was known, such as Drink and It Is Never Too Late to Mend.

In 1891 Warner played the title role in a stage version of The Count of Monte Christo at the Avenue Theatre in London.

In May 1895 it was reported that Warner had been "touring in the English provinces", performing a play called Under the Mask. Warner and his daughter Grace performed in the newly built Lyric Theatre at Hammersmith in July 1895. The opening bill consisted of a new drama, A House of Lies and the stage adaption of Tennyson's Dora.

Warner's wife Fanny died in January 1899 at Clacton-on-Sea, county Essex.

In April 1902 at London's Wyndham's Theatre Warner opened in a drama called Heard at the Telephone (an English version of the French play Au Telephone). The play included an "arduous scene" where the anguished husband (played by Warner) hears the sounds of his wife being murdered via the telephone. On the opening night Warner's "forcible acting secured for him a triple call".

In late-January 1903 Warner performed in A Snug Little Kingdom, a three-act comedy by Mark Ambient, at the Royalty Theatre in Soho.

In December 1904 Warner played the role of 'Canio' in a dramatic version by Charles Brookfield of Leoncavallo's opera, Pagliacci, at the Savoy Theatre in London's West End. A reviewer for The Times praised Warner's melodramatic performance, remarking that "he was bold enough and wise enough to play the part 'for all it was worth', risking now and then the danger of being ridiculous for the sake of being effective".

From May 1905 Warner played the role of "the renowned burglar" 'Kleschna' in the melodrama, Leah Kleschna (with Lena Ashwell in the title role), written by the American playwright C. M. S. McLellan. The play was staged in the New Theatre in London's West End. Warner's performance as "the genial, capable, cruel and yet kind Kleschna" was described as "an extraordinary bit of work", the reviewer commenting on "the intense interest which this actor takes in the minutest detail of his part".

In September 1906 Warner appeared in Herbert Beerbohm Tree's production of Shakespeare's The Winter's Tale, at London's His Majesty's Theatre.

=== New York ===
Warner arrived in New York in late 1906 to work and to visit his son Henry, who had been establishing a career on the American stage. In December 1906 Warner appeared in vaudeville performances at the Alhambra Theatre in Harlem, New York. In February 1907 he appeared in "a condensed version" of Drink at Hyde and Behman's Theatre in Brooklyn.

Warner hoped to arrange an American tour of Drink and other plays, but this did not eventuate. He became accustomed to playing cards at The Lambs Club, a social club associated with theatrical professions in West 44th Street, and reading in the club's library.

=== Death ===
On 11 February 1909 Charles Warner took his own life in a room of the Hotel Seymour in Manhattan, New York, aged 62 years. He was found suspended from a hook on the door of his room. A broken strap was found which indicated Warner had made several attempts to strangle himself. He had left a "rambling message" that began with "I am hounded to my death by thieves, blackmailers and liars", and concluded with: "God bless you all... O dear one, O my beloved, Good-by!". Warner also left cash "for the payment of his board and funeral expenses". Warner's son Henry was about to appear on stage in New York when he was informed of his father's death.

Warner was reported to be insane when he committed suicide. Friends and acquaintances who were interviewed regarding the actor's last days, spoke of Warner "brooding in the Lambs Club", occasionally complaining of "being swindled by unspecified conspirators". His son, Henry Warner, stated that "his father was deranged, and had not appeared on stage for a year". It was reported that Warner's friends had begun to notice "peculiarities in his demeanour" and "are of opinion that the exciting parts he has played, and the force he put into them, unhinged his mind".

A funeral service for Charles Warner was held at the Church of the Transfiguration in East 29th Street and he was buried on 13 February in the Woodlawn Cemetery in the Bronx. The members of The Lambs took charge of funeral arrangements at the church and a delegation from the Club attended the church service and graveside committal.

Warner's obituary in The Times commented that "as an actor he was held in greater esteem in the pit than in the stalls":

He had perfect command of his temperament, however, and did not raise spirits that he could not control. His effects were broad, but carefully measured, and rarely failed. His reading of a character was not finely intellectual, but he could be trusted to get every inch out of a doubtful part... Amongst actors it has often been a matter of discussion why Warner, who repeatedly demonstrated the excellence of his art, did not occupy an even more prominent position with the public. The answer given by those who actually came into contact with him on the stage is that his nervous power was almost too great – his rage frightened them, as it did his audience... [His fellow-artists] knew him as a man of generous impulses and kindly consideration for others, devoid of mean dealings, and willing to help in distress.

== Cultural resonance ==
Charles Warner's celebrated performances as 'Coupeau' in Charles Reade's Drink was a direct influence on D. W. Griffith's 1909 silent film, A Drunkard's Reformation. The construction of the film is "a play within a play", involving the visit to a performance of Drink by an alcoholic father and his "earnest, frightened child". The principal narrative of A Drunkard's Reformation is that of "a husband, father and breadwinner sliding into chronic inebriation and the threat to marriage, family and security which intemperance implies". The visit to the theatre by the father and daughter, to a play depicting the tragic downward path of a drunkard, "acts as the spur to reformation".

The evidence suggests that Griffith's film was a direct tribute to Warner after his tragic death in New York on 11 February 1909. Griffith devised and directed a total of seventy-three films during the first half of 1909 for distribution by the Biograph Company (an average of more than two films a week). The timing of Warner's death, the particular construction of the narrative and the subsequent release date of the film points to the production of the moving picture following directly from Warner's suicide. A Drunkard's Reformation was copyrighted on 31 March 1909 and released the following day by the Biograph Company (less than two months after Warner's death). In its advertising directed to exhibitors, Biograph drew attention to the intended connection with Drink and its powerful message: "The play [within the film] happens to be a dramatization of Emile Zola's L'Assommoir, 'Drink'. Here [the father] sees the awful result of intemperance and resolves to abstain from intoxicants for the rest of his life".
