= The Man Who Turned White =

1919 film by Park Frame

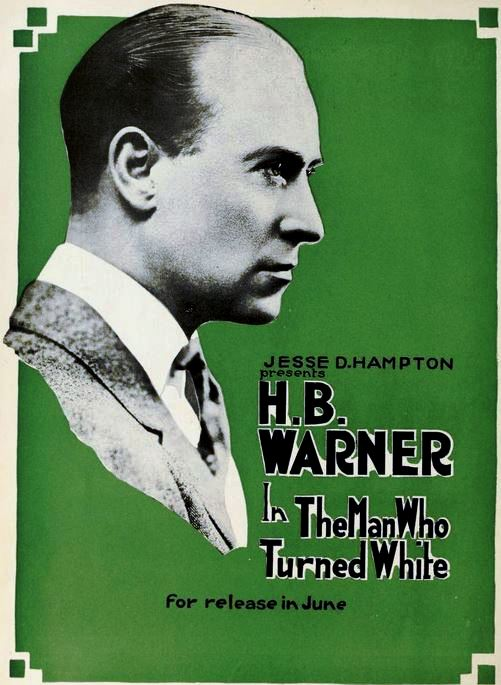
- Advertisement
- Directed by: Park Frame
- Written by: George Elwood Jenks (scenario)
- Story by: F. McGrew Willis
- Produced by: Jesse D. Hampton Prods.
- Starring: H. B. Warner; Barbara Castleton
- Cinematography: William C. Foster
- Distributed by: Robertson-Cole Productions; Exhibitor's Mutual Distributing
- Release date: June 1, 1919
- Running time: 5 reels
- Country: United States
- Language: Silent (English intertitles)

The Man Who Turned White is a 1919 American silent adventure film directed by Park Frame and starring H. B. Warner as a desert shiek. It was produced by Jesse D. Hampton Productions and distributed by Robertson-Cole Company and Exhibitors Mutual Distributing Company. It was rereleased in 1922 by Robertson-Cole.

== Cast ==
- H. B. Warner as Captain Rand, aka Ali Zaman
- Barbara Castleton as Ethel Lambert (per AFI)
- Wedgwood Nowell as Captain Beverly (credited as Wedgewood Nowell)
- Carmen Phillips as Fanina
- Manuel R. Ojeda as Jouder
- Jay Dwiggins as Monsieur Mirabeau
- Walter Perry as Watchman

== Preservation status ==
The Man Who Turned White is a lost film, but snippets or fragments exist at the Library of Congress.
