= Phillips Tead =

American actor (1893–1974)

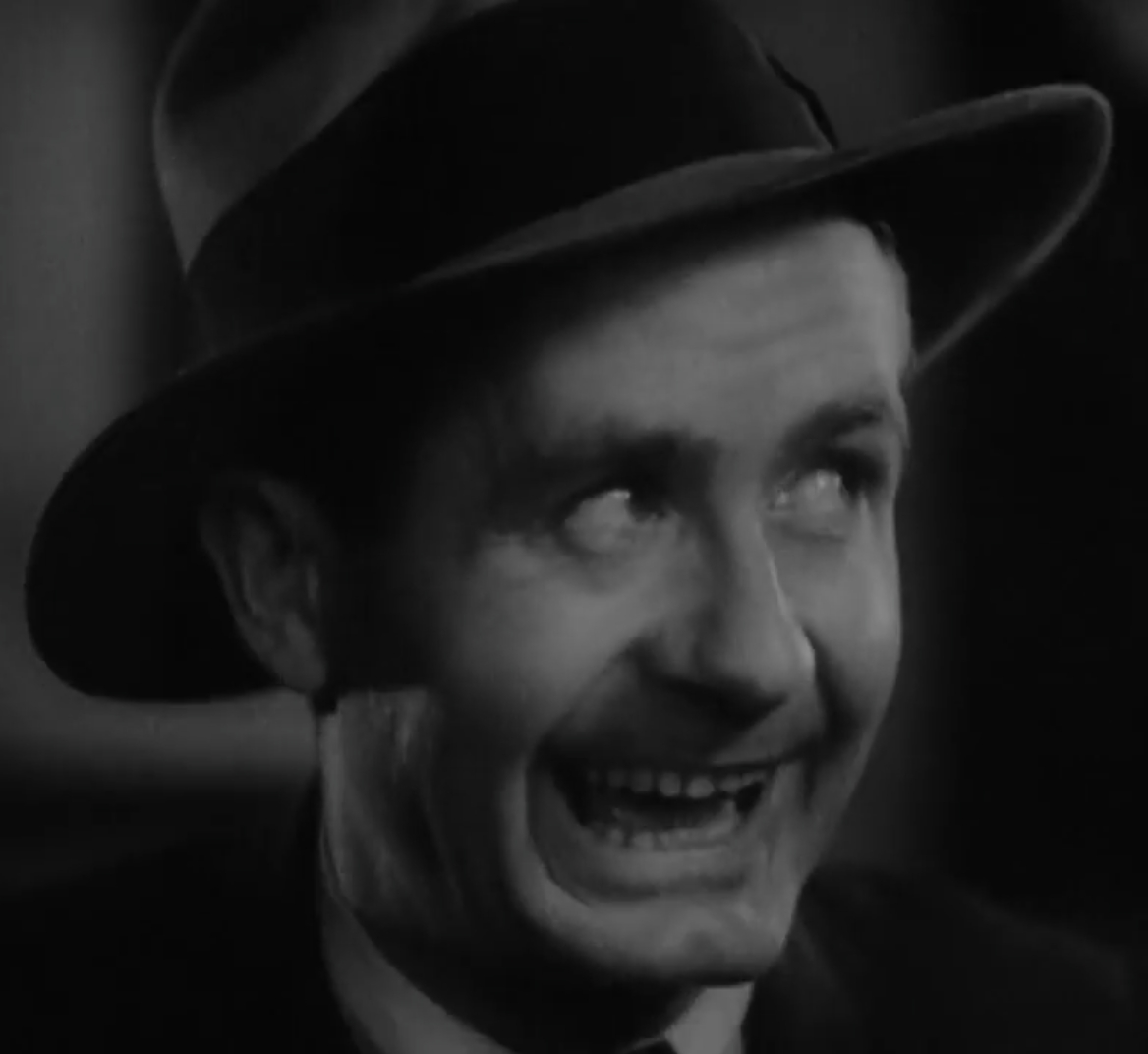
- Tead in The Front Page (1931)
- Born: September 29, 1893; Somerville, Massachusetts, U.S.
- Died: June 9, 1974 (aged 80); Los Angeles, California, U.S.
- Other names: Phil Tead
- Occupation: Actor
- Years active: 1914–1958
- Notable work: Adventures of Superman

Phillips Tead (September 29, 1893 – June 9, 1974) was an American character actor in film and television, sometimes billed as Phil Tead.

== Biography ==
Born in Somerville, Massachusetts, in 1893, among his many roles, Tead might be best remembered as the semi-recurring character "Professor Pepperwinkle," an eccentric inventor, in several of the color episodes of the 1950s TV series Adventures of Superman. His appearances included the final episode, "All That Glitters." His first appearance had been as a shopkeeper named Mr. Willy, a similarly eccentric character.

A visible early role is his appearance in Horse Feathers, the 1932 Marx Brothers comedy, in which he plays a radio play-by-play announcer at the film's climactic college football game.

His film career began in silent pictures in 1914 and ran some 40 years. In the early 1950s he turned his attention primarily to television, appearing in various western series as well as Superman.

Phil Tead starred in the episode "Old Bailey" of the western series The Lone Ranger in 1952 from Season 3, episode 49, where he played the title character Old Bailey along with John Hart and Jay Silverheels. In a 1955 episode “Showdown at Sand Creek”, he played the storekeeper Pop Dawson.

In 1957 Tead appeared as Young on the TV western series Cheyenne in the episode titled "Land Beyond the Law."

In 1958-1958 Tead appeared in several episodes of the TV western series The Lawman. In 1967 Tead appeared in an uncredited role as Padre on the TV western The Big Valley in the episode titled "Days of Grace."

He died in Los Angeles, California, age 80.

== Selected filmography ==
- The Lost Paradise (1914) - Billy Hopkins
- She Loves and Lies (1920) - Bob Brummell
- Whispers (1920) - Wesley Maced
- The Fighting Blade (1923) - Lord Trevor
- Lightnin' (1930) - Monte Winslow
- Reaching for the Moon (1930) - Reporter Looking for Aero Girls (uncredited)
- Kiki (1931) - Eddie
- The Front Page (1931) - Wilson
- Kick In (1931) - Burke, Reporter (uncredited)
- The Vice Squad (1931) - Tony - Waiter
- The Guilty Generation (1931) - Skid
- The Final Edition (1932) - Dan Cameron - Reporter
- The Trial of Vivienne Ware (1932) - Mac the Reporter (uncredited)
- The Dark Horse (1932) - Bellhop (uncredited)
- What Price Hollywood? (1932) - Jimmy - the Assistant Director (uncredited)
- The Washington Masquerade (1932) - Daly - New York Times Reporter (uncredited)
- Lady and Gent (1932) - Fight Commentator (uncredited)
- Winner Take All (1932) - Reporter (uncredited)
- Horse Feathers (1932) - Football Commentator (uncredited)
- The Most Dangerous Game (1932) - Passenger on Yacht (uncredited)
- Faithless (1932) - Reporter (uncredited)
- Me and My Gal (1932) - Radio Salesman (uncredited)
- Lawyer Man (1932) - Reporter with Cigar (uncredited)
- 20,000 Years in Sing Sing (1932) - Reporter in Crowd (uncredited)
- Broadway Bad (1933) - Joe Flynn (uncredited)
- King of the Jungle (1933) - Reporter (uncredited)
- Sailor's Luck (1933) - Nugent Busby (uncredited)
- Gabriel Over the White House (1933) - Reporter (uncredited)
- Central Airport (1933) - Duke, Airplane Ticket Agent (uncredited)
- Picture Snatcher (1933) - Reporter F.L. Strange (uncredited)
- I Loved a Woman (1933) - Reporter (uncredited)
- The Bowery (1933) - Tout (uncredited)
- The Big Bluff (1933)
- Meet the Baron (1933) - Bus Tour Guide (uncredited)
- College Coach (1933) - Reporter (uncredited)
- Sitting Pretty (1933) - Aide (uncredited)
- Lady Killer (1933) - Seymour - Usher Sergeant (uncredited)
- Going Hollywood (1933) - Freddie (uncredited)
- This Side of Heaven (1934) - Pete - the Photographer (uncredited)
- Six of a Kind (1934) - Clerk in Newspaper Office
- The Cat and the Fiddle (1934) - Reporter (uncredited)
- George White's Scandals (1934) - Publicity Man (uncredited)
- Glamour (1934) - Jimmy
- Stand Up and Cheer! (1934) - Vaudevillian (uncredited)
- Sing and Like It (1934) - Ticket Salesman (uncredited)
- Change of Heart (1934) - Brisbane's Assistant (uncredited)
- The Thin Man (1934) - Reporter (uncredited)
- Let's Talk It Over (1934) - Golf Professional (uncredited)
- The Cat's-Paw (1934) - Reporter (uncredited)
- Dames (1934) - Reporter (uncredited)
- Evelyn Prentice (1934) - Reporter #3 (uncredited)
- Behold My Wife! (1934) - Chauffeur (uncredited)
- One Hour Late (1934) - Wally (uncredited)
- Biography of a Bachelor Girl (1935) - Hendricks (uncredited)
- The Gilded Lily (1935) - Rollercoaster Attendant (uncredited)
- Wings in the Dark (1935) - Second Reporter (uncredited)
- Carnival (1935) - Barker (uncredited)
- The Woman in Red (1935) - Reporter Talking to Mike (uncredited)
- Gold Diggers of 1935 (1935) - Head Bellman (uncredited)
- It Happened in New York (1935) - Radio Announcer
- Straight from the Heart (1935) - Ward Heeler (uncredited)
- Men Without Names (1935) - Reporter (uncredited)
- Lady Tubbs (1935) - Rider (uncredited)
- The Daring Young Man (1935) - Cripps - Star Reporter
- Woman Wanted (1935) - Second Juror Talking to Mike (uncredited)
- Orchids to You (1935) - Process Server (uncredited)
- Here Comes the Band (1935) - Soldier (scenes deleted)
- Page Miss Glory (1935) - Miss Glory's Radio Announcer (uncredited)
- The Affair of Susan (1935) - Boat Ride Concessionaire (uncredited)
- The Gay Deception (1935) - Auctioneer (uncredited)
- Navy Wife (1935) - Motorcycle Attendant (uncredited)
- Charlie Chan in Shanghai (1935) - Reporter (uncredited)
- The Payoff (1935) - Radio Sports Broadcaster (uncredited)
- Mary Burns, Fugitive (1935) - Reporter
- Show Them No Mercy! (1935) - Ticket Clerk (uncredited)
- Anything Goes (1936) - Photographer (uncredited)
- The Milky Way (1936) - Todd Fight Radio Announcer (uncredited)
- Sutter's Gold (1936) - Lewis's Secretary (uncredited)
- The Great Ziegfeld (1936) - Press Agent (uncredited)
- Absolute Quiet (1936) - Dallas Airport Radio Operator (uncredited)
- The Princess Comes Across (1936) - Jones - American Newsreel Man (uncredited)
- Women Are Trouble (1936) - Granger (uncredited)
- Hollywood Boulevard (1936) - Radio Master of Ceremonies (uncredited)
- Murder with Pictures (1936) - Reporter (uncredited)
- Over the Goal (1937) - Sound Technician (uncredited)
- The Hardys Ride High (1939) - Taxi Driver (uncredited)
- Tell No Tales (1939) - Marty (uncredited)
- 6,000 Enemies (1939) - Reporter (uncredited)
- Stronger Than Desire (1939) - Second Reporter on Telephone (uncredited)
- I Stole a Million (1939) - Charlie (uncredited)
- Music in My Heart (1940) - Marshall
- Johnny Apollo (1940) - Reporter (uncredited)
- Susan and God (1940) - Exiting Theater Patron (uncredited)
- Pier 13 (1940) - Photographer (uncredited)
- The Westerner (1940) - Prisoner (uncredited)
- Las Vegas Nights (1941) - Club Nevada Croupier (uncredited)
- Buy Me That Town (1941) - Mr. Ramsey, Druggist
- Right to the Heart (1942) - McAllister
- Rings on Her Fingers (1942) - Ticket Agent (uncredited)
- This Gun for Hire (1942) - Machinist (uncredited)
- You're Telling Me (1942) - Chauffeur (uncredited)
- Pacific Rendezvous (1942) - Taxi Driver (uncredited)
- You Can't Escape Forever (1942) - Reporter at Execution (uncredited)
- Casanova Brown (1944) - License Clerk (uncredited)
- It's in the Bag! (1945) - Ninth National Bank Representative (uncredited)
- Diamond Horseshoe (1945) - Waiter with Cart (uncredited)
- State Fair (1945) - Fire-Eater Barker (uncredited)
- The Dolly Sisters (1945) - Speakeasy Patron (uncredited)
- Colonel Effingham's Raid (1946) - Advertising Manager (uncredited)
- Deadline for Murder (1946) - Restaurant Patron (uncredited)
- California (1947) - Eddie (uncredited)
- The Big Punch (1948) - Reporter Peters (uncredited)
- Act of Violence (1949) - Hotel Day Clerk (uncredited)
- Pride of Maryland (1951) - Spectator (uncredited)
- Goodbye, My Fancy (1951) - Reporter (uncredited)
- The Law and the Lady (1951) - Assistant Manager (uncredited)
- Jim Thorpe – All-American (1951) - Chairman of Olympics Board (uncredited)
- The Unknown Man (1951) - Ambulance Intern Attendant (uncredited)
- Callaway Went Thataway (1951) - Salesman (uncredited)
- Glory Alley (1952) - Tom - NYC Sportswriter (uncredited)
- Bonzo Goes to College (1952) - Judge (uncredited)
- Arctic Flight (1952) - Squid Tucker
- Kansas City Confidential (1952) - Mr. Collins (uncredited)
- The Lawless Breed (1952) - Reporter (uncredited)
- Fangs of the Arctic (1953) - MacGregor - Trading Post Owner
- Confidentially Connie (1953) - Prof. McKeever (uncredited)
- A Lion Is in the Streets (1953) - Juror (uncredited)
- Those Redheads from Seattle (1953) - Doctor (uncredited)
- So Big (1953) - Buyer in Open Marketplace (uncredited)
- Loophole (1954) - Bank Manager (uncredited)
- Fangs of the Wild (1954) - Mac
- Wiretapper (1955) - Mr. Wiggins - Postman
- The Tender Trap (1955) - Wendell (voice, uncredited)
- Rockabilly Baby (1957) - Coach Ed Stone
- The Hard Man (1957) - Card Player (uncredited)
- The Book of Acts Series (1957) - Church Elder (1957)
