= The Pagan God =

1919 silent film

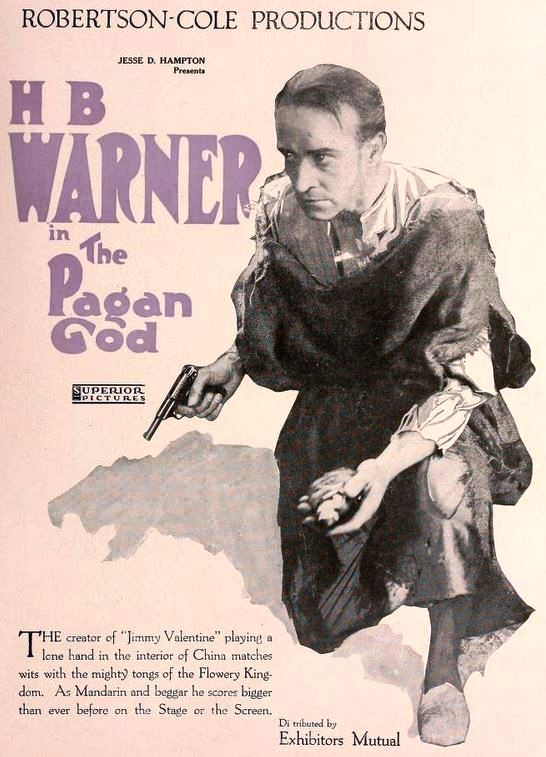
- Directed by: Park Frame
- Written by: George Elwood Jenks; F. McGrew Willis
- Produced by: Jesse D. Hampton
- Starring: H. B. Warner; Carmen Phillips; Edward Peil Sr.
- Cinematography: William C. Foster
- Production company: Jesse D. Hampton Productions
- Distributed by: Robertson-Cole Distributing Corporation
- Release date: August 4, 1919
- Running time: 50 minutes
- Country: United States
- Languages: Silent; English intertitles

The Pagan God is a 1919 American silent drama film directed by Park Frame and starring H. B. Warner, Carmen Phillips and Edward Peil Sr.

== Cast ==
- H. B. Warner as Bruce Winthrop
- Carmen Phillips as Tai Chen
- Edward Peil Sr. as Wah Kung
- Yutaka Abe as Wong
- Carl Stockdale as Henry Addison
- Marguerite De La Motte as Beryl Addison
- Walter Perry as American Minister

== Bibliography ==
- Robert B. Connelly. The Silents: Silent Feature Films, 1910-36, Volume 40, Issue 2. December Press, 1998.
