= The Home Town Girl =

1919 film by Robert G. Vignola

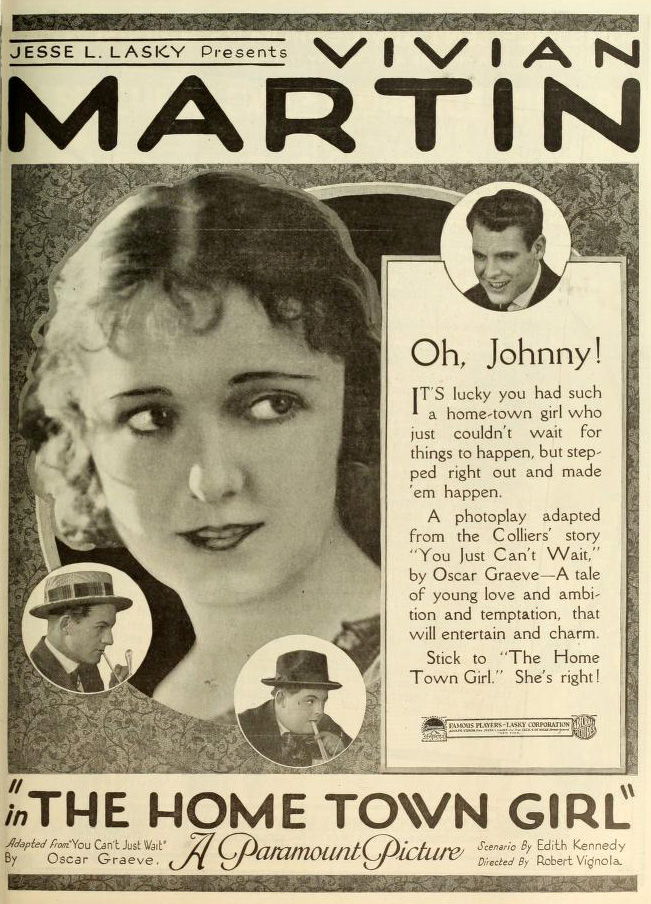
- Ad for film
- Directed by: Robert G. Vignola
- Screenplay by: Oscar Graeve; Edith Kennedy
- Starring: Vivian Martin; Ralph Graves; Lee Phelps; Carmen Phillips; Stanhope Wheatcroft; Herbert Standing
- Cinematography: Frank E. Garbutt
- Production company: Famous Players–Lasky Corporation
- Distributed by: Paramount Pictures
- Release date: May 11, 1919
- Running time: 50 minutes
- Country: United States
- Language: Silent (English intertitles)

The Home Town Girl is a 1919 American silent comedy film directed by Robert G. Vignola, written by Oscar Graeve and Edith Kennedy, and starring Vivian Martin, Ralph Graves, Lee Phelps, Carmen Phillips, Stanhope Wheatcroft, and Herbert Standing. It was released on May 11, 1919, by Paramount Pictures.

== Plot ==
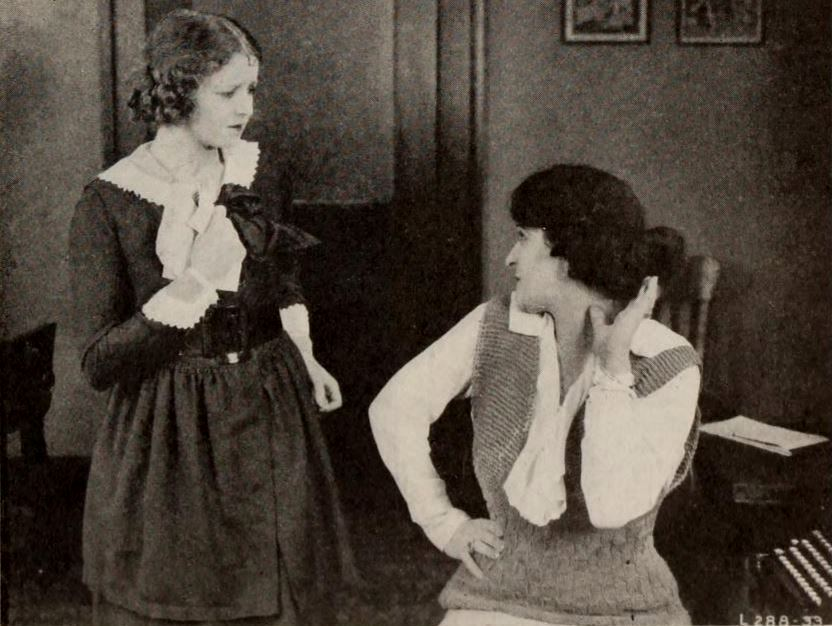
Still from the film: Vivian Martin at left, Carmen Phillips at right

Nell Fanshawe has so many suitors that she does not know what to do, and against her parents’ wishes she looks with favor upon John Stanley, who works in the village drug store. John becomes ambitious and goes to New York City to seek his fortune. He sells some valuable rugs to a wealthy lady and is persuaded by a discharged clerk to try his hand at cards. After he loses all of the firm's money in a poker game, he runs away. Nell goes to the city, obtains work in the same firm, and after she eventually finds John gets his position restored so in the end they find happiness.

== Cast ==
- Vivian Martin as Nell Fanshawe
- Ralph Graves as John Stanley
- Lee Phelps as Frank Willis
- Carmen Phillips as Nan Powderly
- Stanhope Wheatcroft as Steve Ratling
- Herbert Standing as Peter Jellaby
- Pietro Sosso as Mr. Fanshawe
- Edythe Chapman as Mrs. Fanshawe
- William Courtright as Ryder Brother
- Tom Bates as Ryder Brother
- Thomas Persse as Manager
