= The Sunset Trail (1917 film) =

1917 film by George Melford

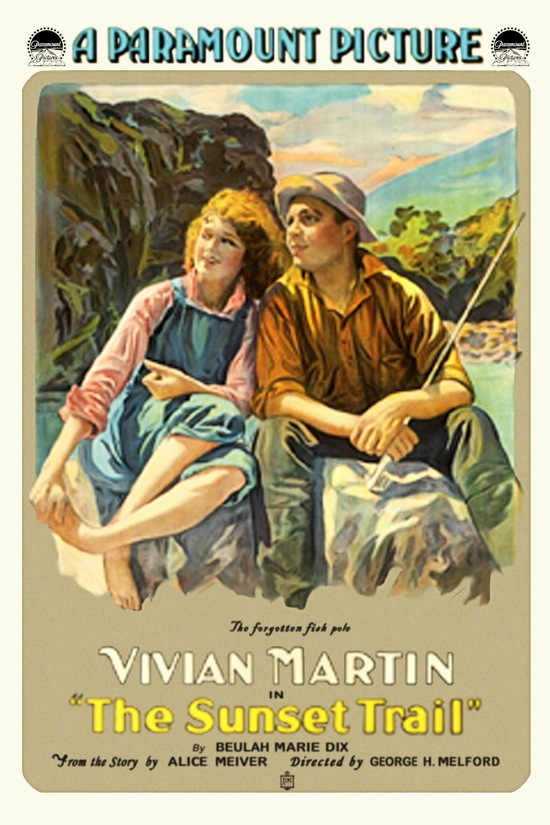
- Theatrical release poster
- Directed by: George Melford
- Screenplay by: Beulah Marie Dix; Alice McIver
- Produced by: Jesse L. Lasky
- Starring: Vivian Martin; Henry A. Barrows; William Elmer; Harrison Ford; Charles Ogle; Carmen Phillips
- Cinematography: Percy Hilburn (French)
- Production companies: Jesse L. Lasky Feature Play Company; Famous Players–Lasky Corporation
- Distributed by: Paramount Pictures
- Release date: October 13, 1917
- Running time: 50 minutes
- Country: United States
- Language: Silent (English intertitles)

The Sunset Trail is a 1917 American silent drama film directed by George Melford, written by Beulah Marie Dix and Alice McIver, and starring Vivian Martin, Henry A. Barrows, William Elmer, Harrison Ford, Charles Ogle, and Carmen Phillips. The picture was released on October 13, 1917, by Paramount Pictures.

== Cast ==
- Henry A. Barrows as Vernon Treloar
- William Elmer as Price Lovel
- Harrison Ford as Kirk Levington
- Vivian Martin as Bess Aiken
- Charles Ogle as Judd Aiken
- Carmen Phillips as Camilla Aiken

== Reception ==
Like many American films of the time, The Sunset Trail was subject to cuts by city and state film censorship boards. The Chicago Board of Censors ordered cut one intertitle, "I must see you alone," and all love scenes between the married woman and man except for the last one.

== Preservation status ==
The film is preserved at the George Eastman Museum Motion Picture Collection.
