= The Forgotten Woman (1921 film) =

1921 film

- Directed by: Park Frame
- Screenplay by: Evelyn Campbell; Catherine Carr
- Starring: Pauline Starke; J. Frank Glendon
- Production company: Pioneer Film Corp.
- Release date: July 26, 1921 (United States)

The Forgotten Woman is a 1921 silent American melodrama film directed by Park Frame and starring Pauline Stark.

== Plot ==
A "water waif" named Dixie is adopted by a hateful woman and tricked into marrying the woman's son. After her new husband is arrested on their wedding night, she ends up falling for another man.

== Cast ==
- Pauline Starke as Dixie LaRose
- J. Frank Glendon as Julian LaRose
- Allan Forrest as Keith Demming
- Laura Winston as 'Sis' Maloney
- Roy Coulson as Joe Maloney

== Production ==
Reportedly, Catherine Carr was visiting the Carolinas when she happened upon a group of Southerners who lived a colorful, bohemian lifestyle along a river. Her trip inspired her to write the script for The Forgotten Woman.
