= H. B. Warner =

English film and theatre actor (1876–1958)

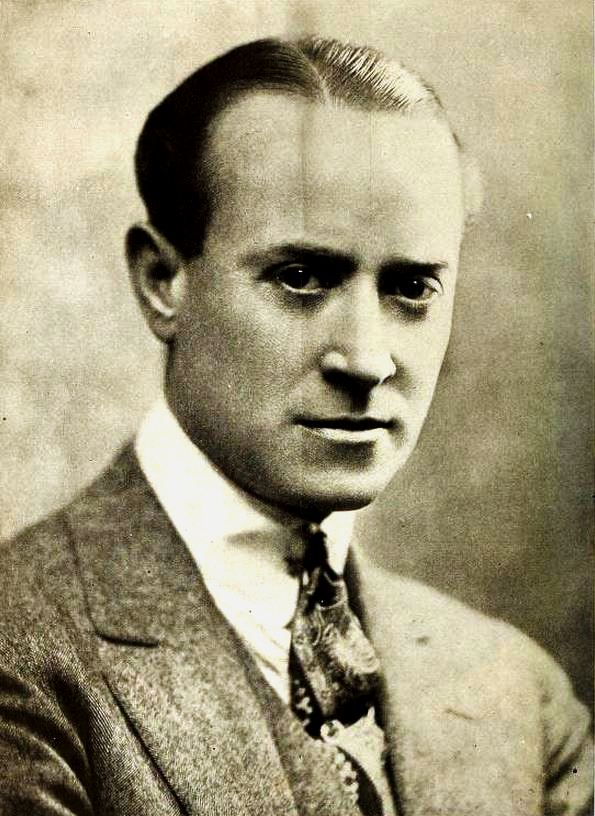
- Film Fun, 1919
- Born: Henry Byron Lickfold; 26 October 1876; St John's Wood, London, England
- Died: 21 December 1958 (aged 82); Woodland Hills, Los Angeles, California, US
- Resting place: Chapel of the Pines Crematory, Los Angeles, California
- Occupation: Actor
- Years active: 1896–1958
- Spouses: Mrs. Fred R. Hamlin (m. 1907; died 1913) Rita Stanwood (m. 1915; div. 1933)
- Children: 3
- Father: Charles Warner

Henry Byron Warner (né Lickfold; 26 October 1876 – 21 December 1958) was an English film and theatre actor. He was popular during the silent era and played Jesus Christ in The King of Kings. In later years, he successfully moved into supporting roles and appeared in numerous films directed by Frank Capra.

Warner's most recognizable role to modern audiences is Mr. Gower in It's a Wonderful Life, directed by Capra. He appeared in the original 1937 version of Lost Horizon as Chang, for which he was nominated for the Academy Award for Best Supporting Actor.

== Early life ==
Henry Warner was born in St John's Wood, London, England in 1876, and educated at Bedford School. His father, Charles Warner, was an actor, and although Henry initially thought about studying medicine, he eventually performed on the stage. He had an older sister, Grace Warner (1873–1925), who was a stage actress and manager.

== Career ==
=== Stage ===
Warner's stage debut came in It's Never Too Late to Mend when he was 21. He acted in several plays before coming to the United States for the 1905–1906 season. His Broadway credits include Silence (1924), You and I (1922), Danger (1921), Sleeping Partners (1918), Out There (1917), and Blackbirds (1912).

=== Film ===
Warner began his film career in silent films in 1914 when he debuted in The Lost Paradise. He played lead roles in the silent era and also appeared in numerous Broadway plays. His greatest success was the role of Jesus in Cecil B. DeMille's silent epic The King of Kings in 1927. He received good reviews for this role, but with the advent of sound era, he turned toward supporting roles, mostly because of his age. He usually was cast in dignified roles in numerous films of the 1930s and 1940s. He played in the 1930 version of Liliom (as the Heavenly Magistrate), in Five Star Final (1931, as Michael Townsend), in Grand Canary (1934, as Dr. Ismay), and the 1935 version of A Tale of Two Cities as Gabelle. He portrayed the strict judge in Mr. Deeds Goes to Town (1936). He appeared in the original 1937 version of Lost Horizon as Chang, for which he was nominated for the Academy Award for Best Supporting Actor.

Among his later films were You Can't Take It With You (1938), Mr. Smith Goes to Washington (1939), The Rains Came (1939), and The Corsican Brothers (1941). In It's a Wonderful Life (1946), he played an atypical role as the drunken druggist. Occasionally, Warner was seen in sinister roles as in the 1941 film version of The Devil and Daniel Webster, in which he played the ghost of John Hathorne. Also that year, he played the villainous role of Mr. Carrington in Topper Returns. He had a cameo in Sunset Boulevard (1950), directed by Billy Wilder, in which he played himself, playing cards with some other former silent film stars, including Buster Keaton and Anna Q. Nilsson. He had a cameo role in Cecil B DeMille's The Ten Commandments (1956). His last film role was an uncredited cameo in Darby's Rangers (1958).

== Personal life ==
Warner was married twice, first to the former Mrs. F. R. Hamlin, who died in 1913, and from 1915 until 1933 to Marguerite L. "Rita" Stanwood.

== Death ==
On 21 December 1958, Warner died in Los Angeles, California of a heart attack and was interred in the community vaults of the Chapel of the Pines Crematory in Los Angeles, California. Warner has a star on the Hollywood Walk of Fame at 6600 Hollywood Boulevard.

== Filmography ==
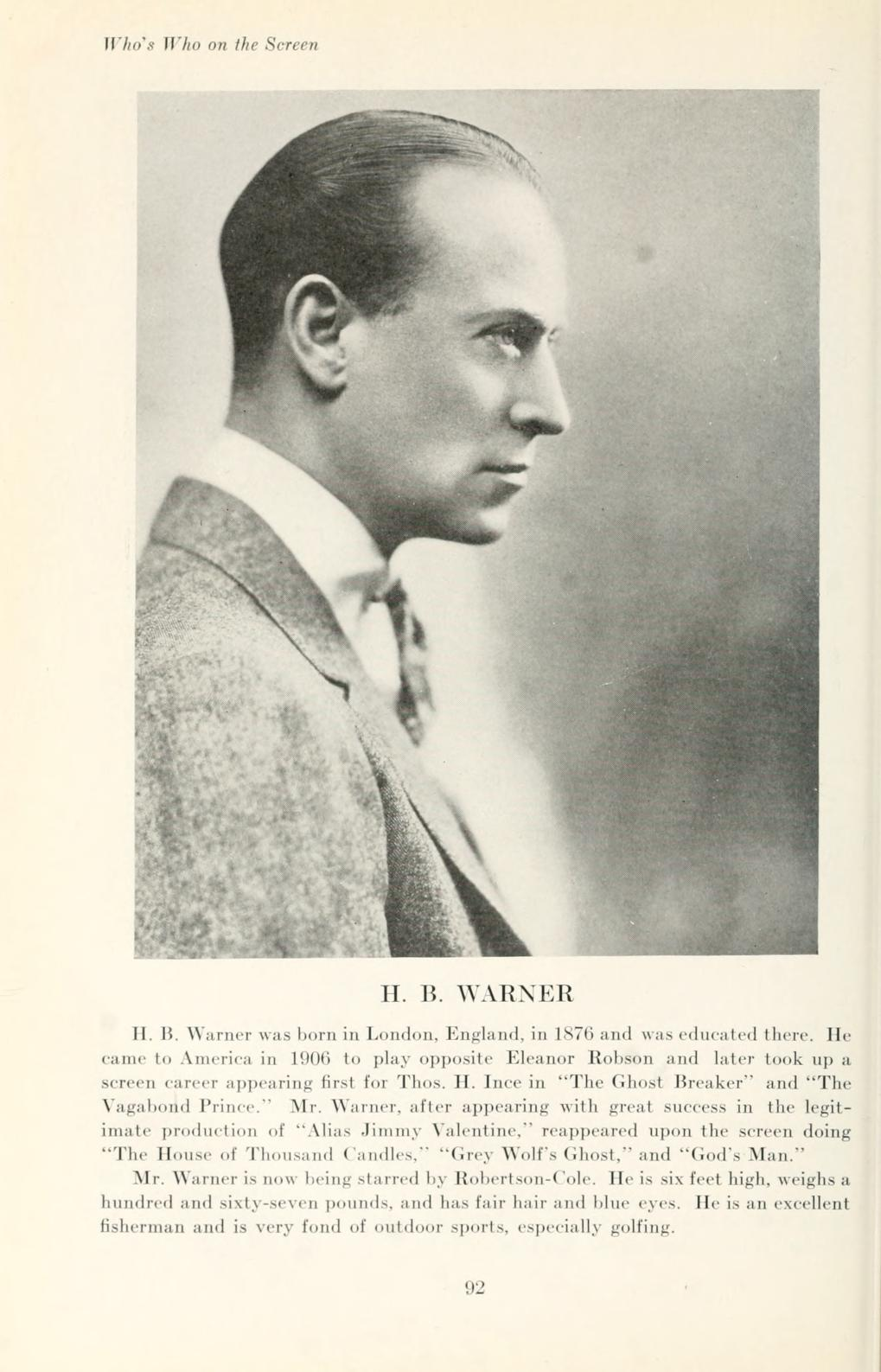
Warner, 1920

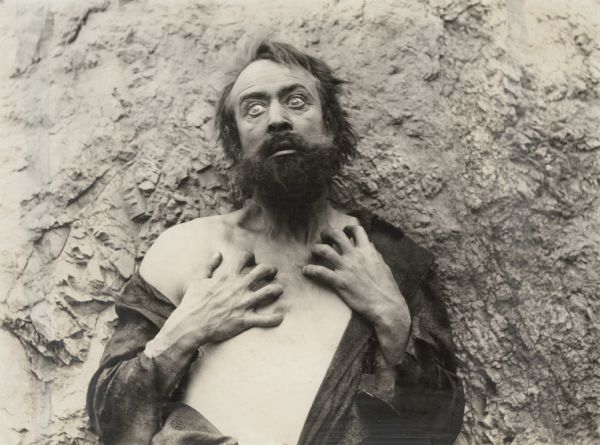
In the 1916 silent drama The Beggar of Cawnpore, Warner portrayed a British army doctor in India reduced to wild-eyed beggary by morphine addiction.

- The Lost Paradise (1914) as Reuben Warren
- The Ghost Breaker (1914) as Warren Jarvis
- The Market of Vain Desire (1916) as John Armstrong
- Shell 43 (1916) as William Berner
- The Raiders (1916) as Scott Wells
- The Beggar of Cawnpore (1916) as Dr. Robert Lowndes
- The Vagabond Prince (1916) as Prince Torio
- The Danger Trail (1917) as John Howland
- Wrath (1917) as Feodor
- The Seventh Sin (1917) as The Grand Duke
- God's Man (1917) as Arnold L'Hommedieu
- For a Woman's Honor (1919) as Captain Clyde Mannering
- The Man Who Turned White (1919) as Captain Rand
- A Fugitive from Matrimony (1919) as Stephen Van Courtlandt
- Haunting Shadows (1919) as John Glenarm
- The Pagan God (1919) as Bruce Winthrop
- The Gray Wolf's Ghost (1919) as Doctor West
- The White Dove (1920) as Sylvester Lanyon
- One Hour Before Dawn (1920) as George Clayton
- Felix O'Day (1920) as Felix O'Day
- Uncharted Channels (1920) as Timothy Webb Jr
- Dice of Destiny (1920) as Jimmy Doyle
- When We Were 21 (1921) as Richard Carewe
- Zaza (1923) as Bernard Dufresne
- Is Love Everything? (1924) as Jordan Southwick
- Whispering Smith (1926) as 'Whispering Smith'
- Silence (1926) as Jim Warren
- The King of Kings (1927) as Jesus
- Sorrell and Son (1927) as Stephen Sorrell
- French Dressing (1927) as Phillip Grey
- Man-Made Women (1928) as Jules Moret
- Romance of a Rogue (1928)
- The Naughty Duchess (1928) as Duke de St. Maclou
- Conquest (1928) as James Farnham
- The Doctor's Secret (1929) as Richard Garson
- Stark Mad (1929) as Prof. Dangerfield
- The Divine Lady (1929) as Sir William Hamilton
- The Trial of Mary Dugan (1929) as District Attorney Galway
- The Gamblers (1929) as James Darwin
- The Argyle Case (1929) as Hurley
- The Show of Shows (1929) as The Victim - Guillotine Sequence
- Tiger Rose (1929) as Dr. Cusick
- Wedding Rings (1929) as Lewis Dike
- The Green Goddess (1930) as Major Crespin
- The Furies (1930) as Oliver Bedlow
- The Second Floor Mystery (1930) as Inspector Bray
- Wild Company (1930) as Henry Grayson
- On Your Back (1930) as Raymond Pryor
- Liliom (1930) as Chief Magistrate
- The Princess and the Plumber (1930) as Prince Conrad of Daritzia
- A Woman of Experience (1931) as Major Hugh Schmidt
- The Reckless Hour (1931) as Walter Nichols
- Five Star Final (1931) as Michael Townsend
- Expensive Women (1931) as Melville Raymond
- Charlie Chan's Chance (1932) as Inspector Fife
- The Menace (1932) as Inspector Tracy
- A Woman Commands (1932) as Col. Stradimirovitsch
- Unholy Love (1932) as Dr. Daniel Gregory
- Cross-Examination (1932) as Gerald Waring
- Tom Brown of Culver (1932) as Dr. Brown
- The Crusader (1932) as Phillip Brandon
- The Phantom of Crestwood (1932) as Priam Andes
- The Son-Daughter (1932) as Sin Kai
- Supernatural (1933) as Dr. Carl Houston
- Jennie Gerhardt (1933) as William Gerhardt
- Christopher Bean (1933) as Maxwell Davenport
- Sorrell and Son (1933) as Captain Stephen Sorrell
- Grand Canary (1934) as Dr. Ismay
- In Old Santa Fe (1934) as Charlie Miller
- Behold My Wife (1934) as Hubert Carter
- Night Alarm (1934) as Henry B. Smith
- Born to Gamble (1935) as Carter Mathews
- A Tale of Two Cities (1935) as Gabelle
- The Garden Murder Case (1936) as Major Fenwicke-Ralston
- Rose of the Rancho (1936) as Don Pasqual Castro
- Moonlight Murder (1936) as Godfrey Chiltern
- Mr. Deeds Goes to Town (1936) as Judge May
- Blackmailer (1936) as Michael Rankin
- Along Came Love (1936) as Dr. Martin
- Lost Horizon (1937) as Chang
- Our Fighting Navy (1937) as British Consul Brent
- Victoria the Great (1937) as Lord Melbourne
- Girl of the Golden West (1938) as Father Sienna
- The Adventures of Marco Polo (1938) as Chen Tsu
- Kidnapped (1938) as Angus Rankeillor
- The Toy Wife (1938) as Victor Brigard
- Bulldog Drummond in Africa (1938) as Col. J.A. Nielsen
- Army Girl (1938) as Col. Armstrong
- You Can't Take It with You (1938) as Ramsay
- Arrest Bulldog Drummond (1938) as Colonel Nielsen
- Let Freedom Ring (1939) as Rutledge
- Bulldog Drummond's Secret Police (1939) as Colonel Nielson
- The Gracie Allen Murder Case (1939) as Richard Lawrence
- Bulldog Drummond's Bride (1939) as Colonel Nielson
- Nurse Edith Cavell (1939) as Hugh Gibson
- The Rains Came (1939) as Maharajah
- Mr. Smith Goes to Washington (1939) as Senator Agnew
- New Moon (1940) as Father Michel
- Topper Returns (1941) as Mr. Carrington
- The Devil and Daniel Webster (1941) as Justice John Hathorne
- City of Missing Girls (1941) as Captain McVeigh
- South of Tahiti (1941) as High Chief Kawalima
- The Corsican Brothers (1941) as Dr. Enrico Paoli
- Crossroads (1942) as Prosecuting Attorney
- A Yank in Libya (1942) as Herbert Forbes
- The Boss of Big Town (1942) as Jeffrey Moore
- Hitler's Children (1943) as The Bishop
- Women in Bondage (1943) as Pastor Renz
- Action in Arabia (1944) as Abdul El Rashid
- Enemy of Women (1944) as Col. Eberhart Brandt
- Faces in the Fog (1944) as Defense Attorney Rankins
- Rogues' Gallery (1944) as Prof. Reynolds
- Captain Tugboat Annie (1945) as Judge Abbott
- Strange Impersonation (1946) as Dr. Mansfield
- Gentleman Joe Palooka (1946) as Sen. McCarden
- It's a Wonderful Life (1946) as Mr. Gower
- Driftwood (1947) as Rev. J. Hollingsworth
- High Wall (1947) as Mr. Slocum
- The Prince of Thieves (1948) as Gilbert Head
- The Judge Steps Out (1949) as Chief Justice Hayes
- El Paso (1949) as Judge Fletcher
- Hellfire (1949) as Brother Joseph
- Sunset Boulevard (1950) as himself
- The First Legion (1951) as Fr. Jose Sierra
- Savage Drums (1951) as Maou
- Here Comes the Groom (1951) as Uncle Elihu
- Journey into Light (1951) as Wiz - the Wino
- The Ten Commandments (1956) as Amminadab

== See also ==
- List of actors with Academy Award nominations
