= For a Woman's Honor =

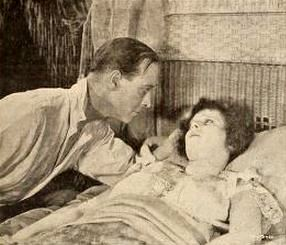
- H. B. Warner and Marguerite De La Motte
- Directed by: Park Frame
- Written by: George Elwood Jenks (scenario)
- Story by: Clifford Howard
- Starring: H. B. Warner
- Production company: Jesse D. Hampton Productions
- Distributed by: Robertson-Cole
- Release date: September 14, 1919
- Running time: 50 minutes
- Country: United States
- Language: Silent (English intertitles)

For a Woman's Honor is a 1919 American silent film directed by Park Frame. It stars H. B. Warner, a stage actor. John Gilbert has a co-starring role in the feature.

== Cast ==
- H. B. Warner as Captain Clyde Mannering
- Marguerite De La Motte as Helen Rutherford
- John Gilbert as Dick Rutherford
- Carmen Phillips as Valeska De Marsay
- Hector V. Sarno as Rajput Nath (credited as Hector Sarno)
- Olive Ann Alcorn
- Roy Coulson
- Carl Stockdale

== Preservation ==
With no prints of For a Woman's Honor located in any film archives, it is a lost film.
