= Bernice Vere =

Australian movie and stage actress (1900–1972)

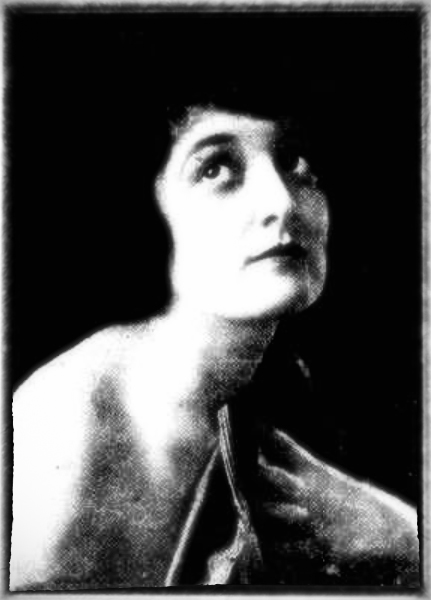
- Vere in 1920 (newspaper photo)
- Born: Bernice Estelle Vert; July 1, 1900; Formby, England
- Died: March 13, 1972 (aged 71); Westfield, New Jersey, US
- Other names: Bernice Vert; Bernice Ware; Bernice Bellah; Bernice Tait
- Occupations: Stage performer; Movie actress; Playwright; Dancer; Violinist
- Spouses: James Warner Bellah (m. 1928; div. 1932) Andrew Tait (m. 1942)

Bernice Vere (1 July 1900 – 13 March 1972) was an English-born stage, playwright, director, and film actress. She emigrated to Australia when she turned 12. She started performing on stage in Australia until the movie-producing team of E.J. Carroll and Snowy Baker discovered her. They cast her in the silent feature The Shadow of Lightning Ridge, where she acted alongside American actress Agnes Vernon.

Vere immigrated to the United States and married a prominent American writer while continuing her career as a stock actor. Her last motion picture was the silent feature Inspiration released in 1928. After her last film, she returned to the stage. She continued acting with several repertoire companies in the United States, developing into a playwright and Director. She died in New Jersey in 1972.

== Early years ==
Vere was the second child born to John W. and Francis A. Vert of Formby, England. An older sister, Adrienne Elizabeth, had previously arrived in July 1895. The 1901 English census lists her father's occupation as a Commercial Traveler (salesperson) and her mother as a stay-at-home parent. In 1911, the 12 year old attended a private girls' school in Sales, England.

Vere demonstrated a talent for singing and musicianship at an early age. Bernice was a gifted violinist, and when she was 6, she became the "youngest candidate in the violin section at the recent examination by the Incorporated Society of Musicians."

In June 1912, Bernice Vert's family, minus her father, emigrated to Australia. The booking was a third-class contract (the only type of ticket available on the ship) and arrived in Sydney on June 19, 1912. The ship's manifest lists her mother, Francis (48), her sister Adrienne (18), and 11-year-old Bernice. Soon after her arrival, Bernice got involved in Australia's theater scene, acting in plays and performed as a child on stage.

== Career ==
=== Stage ===
Learn comedy first, for it is the basis of all drama. First, the fundamentals—then we shall see.

— Bebe Daniels 1924

Her first appearance in an Australian newspaper was in the Freeman's Journal on June 25, 1914. The item mentioned Bernice Vert contributing a recitation to the St Patrick's Old Boys concert. She had just turned 14. When Bernice was 15, the media mentioned her performance at the Casula camp. When Bernice Vert was 16, the news media called her a "talented amateur."

By age 17, she was getting rave reviews for her performance in the comedy — Seven-Twenty-Eight. The newspaper reviewer states:

Miss Bernice Vert showed much artistic talent in the chief role. She was dainty, charming to a degree, and her acting stood out conspicuously. She should succeed in the stage career with hard work and perseverance, which I understand she is desirous of pursuing.

— The Mirror

After turning 18, she would continue her stage performances appearing in the comedies of Potash and Perlmutter's and Business before Pleasure. In February 1919, she sailed to New Zealand to play in Nothing But The Truth. July 1919 would see performances in A Tailor-Made Man

=== Film ===
The ship SS Ventura sailed from San Francisco and arrived in Sydney on September 2, 1919. The ship carried four talented movie personalities recruited by Snowy Baker and approved by E. J. Carroll. Their mission was simple: make movies in Australia with a distinctive Australian flavor. They went to work immediately, starting with research and determining locations to shoot films.

◆ Americans recruited by Snowy Baker to make movies in Australia ◆
Name	Age	Title	Departure Date	Departure Port	Vessel	Arrival Date	Planned Stay	Ref
Wilfred Lucas	48	Director	Aug 12, 1919	San Francisco, CA	Ventura	Sep 2, 1919	1 year	
Bess Meredyth Lucas	29	Screenwriter	Aug 12, 1919	San Francisco, CA	Ventura	Sep 2, 1919	1 year	
Brownie Vernon	23	Actress	Aug 12, 1919	San Francisco, CA	Ventura	Sep 2, 1919	6 months	
John Doerrer	24	Cinematographer	Aug 12, 1919	San Francisco, CA	Ventura	Sep 2, 1919	6 months	
John K. Wells	33	Assistant Director	Sep 9, 1919	San Francisco, CA	Sonoma	unknown	1 year	

The fruits of their collaboration resulted in a trio of films. The first film was The Man from Kangaroo, released in Australia on January 24, 1920. The film featured Snowy Baker, directed by Wilfred Lucas and written by Bess Meredyth. This is the only movie of the Lucas trio to survive and is available on YouTube.

==== The Shadow of Lighting Ridge ====
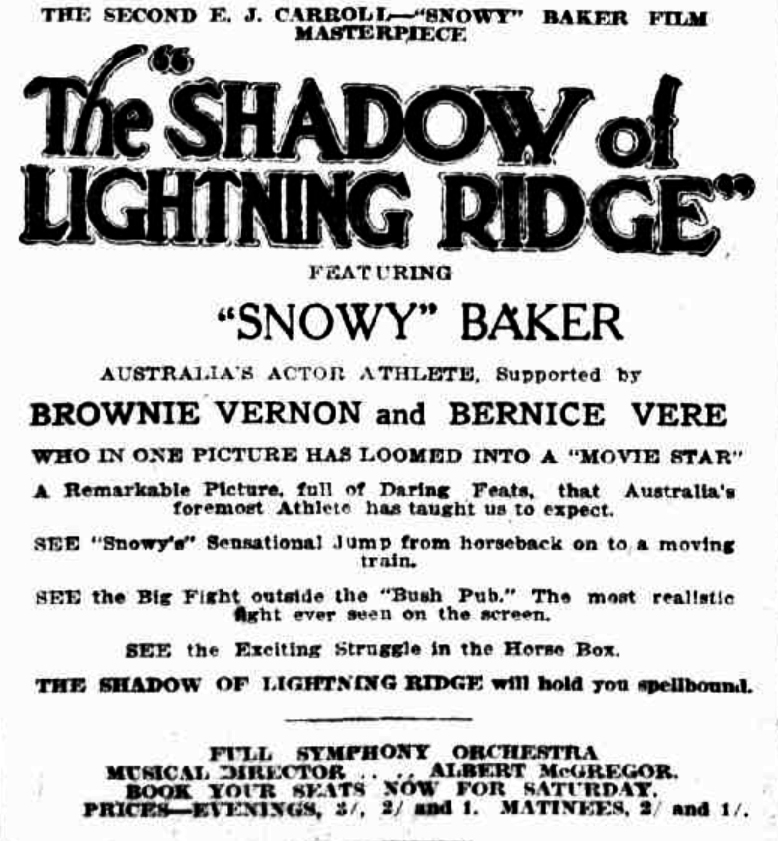
Newspaper ad

The second film of the American troupe was The Shadow of Lightning Ridge released in Australia on April 3, 1920. The feature starred Snowy Baker, was directed by Wilfred Lucas, and written by Bess Meredyth. The film was well received in Australia and successful at the box office.

The Australian media claimed Wilfred Lucas had trouble finding a suitable actress to play the part of Portuguese Annie. They claimed he even held up production until they found the right candidate. Then — Chance brought one Miss Vere along—the rest is now movie history. Being cast for the character of Portuguese Annie provided the vehicle for Bernice Vert's first appearance in the film. Bernice Vert also chose a new film moniker: Bernice Vere. The Australian Leader reported, "This is the English pronunciation of her name, which was originally Vert, and what she has adopted for the stage." Bernice would continue to use that cognomen whenever she appeared in Australian movies. She reverted to using her real name, Bernice Vert, in the 1928 American production of Inspiration.

In the May 16, 1920, issue of Sunday Times, the reviewer observed:

. . . remarkable performance in this film of Miss Bernice Vere. As Portuguese Annie, her work stands out to a striking degree. She has the requisite film temperament and appearance. Movie fans will gush over the expression she puts into her eyes, and she imparts to every movement artistry which many seasoned actresses might envy.

— Sunday Times

A reviewer for the April 15, 1920, issue of The Bulletin wrote:

For the story of "The Shadow of Lightning Ridge' Snowy Baker caught a novice, Bernice Vere, who has discovered the art of facial expression and possesses the appearance suitable for passionate females torn by the headlong emotions. In the film, Bernice makes her debut as Portuguese Annie, a vixenish, jealous barmaid whom the young Australian pictures with the success of a veteran.

— The Bulletin

Since Bernice was an experienced stage actress, her acting impressed the right people. They immediately signed her to a 12-month contract.

==== The Jackeroo of Coolabong ====
The American troupe's third and final film was The Jackeroo of Coolabong, released in Australia on October 16, 1920. The feature starred Snowy Baker, was directed by Wilfred Lucas, and written by Bess Meredyth. The film featured Snowy Baker as Brian O'Farrell, Kathleen Key as Edith MacDonald, Wilfred Lucas as John MacDonald and Bernice Vere as The Moll. Lucas also added Bert Glennon as a co-director and Dudley Blanchard as a film editor. None of these additions were native Australians. The film was well received in Australia and successful at the box office. The film was recut and released in the US as The Fighting Breed.

In the June 18, 1920 issue of the Australian newspaper Leader, the reviewer wrote:

Bernice is young and pretty and combines brains with her good looks, and better still, mobility of feature and natural dramatic intensity of expression quite out of the ordinary. Miss Vere has stage experience, but it remained for the movie to afford an outlet for her unquestioned ability as an emotional actress

— Leader

Men were anxiously waiting at the dock when "There stepped down the gangway, a beautiful blond, shaking her pretty curls at those who had singled her out for her beauty." The article in The Leader describes the arrival of 17-year-old Kathleen Key. After walking down the platform, she delivered a few words, then handed her soapbox to Wilfred Lucas. The Director explained "I did not intend to bring to Australia a leading artist, it is the policy of the Carroll film to make and feature our stars here. That policy shall be carried out, but Miss Key is such a "find" that I thought it necessary to secure her for the benefit of the industry in this country. It will significantly help our budding Australian stars act alongside this clever American girl." This statement offers a partial explanation of why Bernice Vere and other Australian celebrities were passed over for ingenue leads. On another note, her blond locks were concealed or didn't exist, as evidenced by the still shot on-site during the filming

During filming, E. J. Carroll clashed with Wilfred Lucas over alleged excessive expenses. This clash led to the termination of Lucas and Meredyth. They returned to America, arriving in San Francisco, California, on April 5, 1920.

The Library of Congress website claims a complete 16mm copy exists of The Fighting Breed stating, "Holdings: collector; Completeness: complete."

==== The Betrayer ====
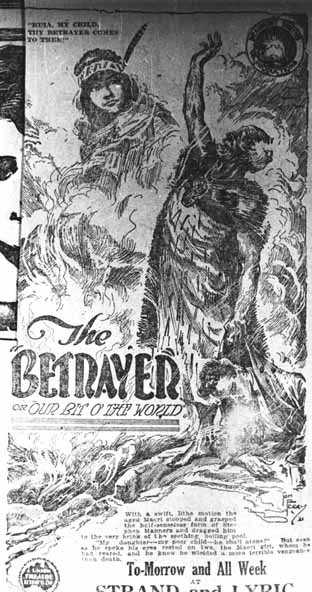
Newspaper ad

Riding the success of The Man from Snowy River, Beaumont Smith 's now turned his attention to his next drama, The Betrayer. The movie's original title was Our Bit O' the World, but Smith changed the title because he thought people thought it was a travelogue. The Betrayer was released in Australia on March 19, 1921. The movie was written, produced, and directed by Beaumont Smith. The film featured Stella Southern as Iwa, Cyril Mackay as Stephen Manners, John Cosgrove as John Barris, and Bernice Vere playing John Barris's wife, Eleanor Barris. Snowy Baker did not act in this film because he had sought his fortunes in America. There are no published reviews of any actor's performance. The film was well received by critics and audiences alike.

A reviewer for the May 18, 1921, issue of The Register wrote:

The Betrayer is an Australian Film Classic— a remarkable six-reel photo-drama — is, it is claimed, Australia's greatest picture. It was created by Australia's greatest producer Beaumont Smith. The new photodrama is a tale of two islands — Australia and New Zealand . . .

— The Register

A reviewer for the May 31, 1921, issue of Sunday Times wrote:

Film is one of the most powerful ever produced in Australia, and with the scenic wonders of New Zealand and the Sunny Beaches and city life of Australia as backgrounds, the betrayer is something or see

— Sunday Times

==== The Blue Mountains Mystery ====
The Blue Mountains Mystery was released in Australia on November 5, 1921. The film was based on Harrison Owen's novel The Mount Marunga Mystery. The movie was written by Raymond Longford and Lottie Lyell, then directed by the same team. The film featured Marjorie Osborne as Mrs. Tracey, John Faulkner as Henry Tracey, Vivian Edwards as Hector Blunt, and Bernice Vere as Pauline Tracey. Most reviews of actors in this movie seemed to focus on Marjorie Osborne (aka Mrs. Henry Hill Osborne).

A reviewer for the November 10, 1921, issue of the newspaper THE BULLETIN wrote:

Though the "heavy" villainess work falls to Marjorie Osborne, an equal share of emotional acting is in the hands of Bernice Vere; both are temperamental without being tempestuous. Marjorie Osborne, as the adventuress, looks her handsomest in the Court scene and does her most thrilling turn when she punctures her husband's chest, the supposed Henry Tracey. As the ingenue daughter, Bernice is natural and pretty in the opening carefree scenes, and as Lady Macbethish as her inches will allow for a sleepwalking act.

— The Bulletin

A reviewer for the December 10, 1921, issue of the magazine TRIAD wrote:

"The Blue Mountain Mystery" is a melodrama of the most ordinary type. One is tempted to wonder what the Director imagines the average intelligence of an Australian audience is, that he produces so thoroughly uninteresting and disconnected a picture.
Miss Bernice Vere looked rather unusual at times, and her gowns were a credit to the chooser. Her best act was the sleepwalking scene, where she looked perfectly natural. (Her habitual expression is suggestive of dreamland and its vagaries.)

— The Triad

This film would become Bernice Vere's last movie appearance in Australia film. An opportunity arose, and the 21-year-old traveled to Honolulu with old family friends, the Heifetz family. (The family of famous violinist Jascha Heifetz.) She departed for San Francisco, arriving on November 2, 1921. Bernice would now seek her fame and fortune in American movies. She would never return to Australia.

=== 1922–1956 ===
In February 1922, the Australian media showed Bernice was in Los Angeles "appearing as Sara to Wilfred Lucas's Abraham in a set of Biblical pictures the Famous Players Lasky firm is producing." American media references the production of some "Biblical Pictures" but there is no mention of a film titled Abraham and Sara. A review of the Catalog of Copyright Entries discovered no records.

The following year, Australian media mentioned Bernice was "busy in New York making pictures with Gloria Swanson." The Bulletin article further stated, "The Sydney girl has had luck in her adventure in America's film world and had to step into an up-to-the-minute shadow drama, Burning Sands, in the making of which she has camped for days in something so close to a desert that a bath was out of the question." George Melford directed Burning Sands, which starred Gloria Swanson and was released in September 1922 by Famous Players–Lasky Corporation. However, a thorough search of the media finds no credited role for Bernice Vere or Bernice Vert.

A Billboard article published in September, claimed "films in which she played the leading parts are The Green Temptation, Abraham and Sara, My American Wife, and Burning Sands. The Green Temptation starred Betty Compson, produced by Famous Players–Lasky and released in April 1922. The media search revealed no credited role for Bernice Vere or Bernice Vert in this film. A media search likewise discovered no credited role in My American Wife starring Gloria Swanson produced by Famous Players–Lasky and released in December 1922.

An article published in the February 1924 issue of the Australian magazine The Bulletin stated "Bernice Vere has left the movies and is working in legitimate drama in the USA." The October 16, 1924, issue of the Los Angeles Times pointed out "Miss Bernice Vert of Australia returned last week from New York City . . . Since leaving Hollywood two years ago, she has been associated with various companies in the east and played with Frank Keenan in the play- "Peter Weston."

In 1928, Bernice Vert acted in her last movie – Inspiration. Bernard McEveety directed the film, which starred George Walsh, Marguerite Clayton, and released in May 1928. Bernice Vert had a credited role as Anna Martin. After her appearance in this movie, Bernice Vert would return to the stage, especially if the part called for a woman with an English or Irish accent.

A new play opened in August 1938, Milan in May, written by Aimee Torriani and Bernice Vert with songs by Songs by Paine Fenimore. Bernice missed opening night because she was still acting in "Night Must Fall" at the Community Playhouse in Spring Lake, New Jersey.

Between October 11 and October 12, 1940, Bernice Vert appeared in the Broadway play Boyd's Daughter. The setting was Boyd's Shop in Donaghreagh, an Ulster Village in Northern Ireland. She played Mrs. Clotworthy. The play lasted for three performances at the Booth Theatre at 222 W. 45th St., New York, NY.

The Courier News of Bridgewater, New Jersey, in an article published in 1947, that " Mrs. A. G. Tait of Scotch Plains, formerly a well-known actress, Bernice Vert, will direct the play "Suspect" to be produced in November." The article also pointed out the performance of Mrs. Tait's play Milan in May in Hollywood.

A new Spanish-American musical debuted in July 1956 - Romance in Rio . Aimee Torriani and Bernice Vert penned the show's book with songs created by Paine Fenimore. All Australian and American media coverage ended after announcing the opening of Romance in Rio. Her stage appearances had ceased gathering national or local media coverage. Bernice would continue to coach acting and other local projects until her death.

== Marriage ==
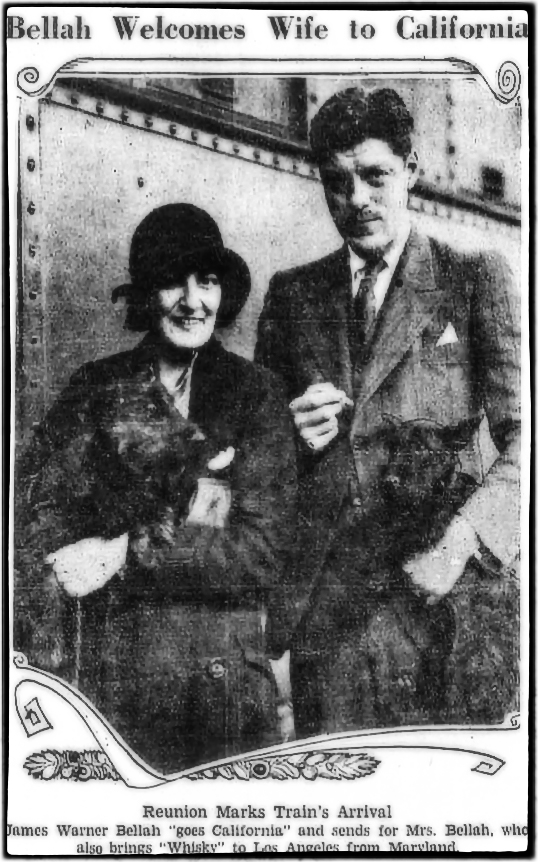
Bellah Welcomes to Wife to California 1930

When Bernice was 27, she married 29-year-old novelist James Warner Bellah Jr. It was Bernice's first marriage and Bellah's second. The marriage ceremony occurred on Saturday, May 12, 1928, in Fulham, England. Documentation supports this English marriage and is consistent with James Bellah's world travels. The name on the English marriage document is Bernice E Vert.

The 1930 census states the couple were living in Easton, Maryland. They would have one son, born in 1931. James Bellah II would inherit his father's propensity for writing and soldiering.

Starting in 1928, James Bellah completed six novels while married to Bernice, including "Dancing Lady" in 1932. The novel was the basis of the Musical Dancing Lady starring Joan Crawford And Clark Gable. The movie was directed by Robert Z. Leonard and released on November 24, 1933. Two years after their son was born, James and Bernice were divorced and Bellah had married Gruzilla Taylor Deshon on May 1, 1933.

In August 1935, Bernice Bellah departed New York bound for London, arriving on August 18, 1935. She was alone but claimed she was married on the manifest.

In February 1936, Bernice Bellah returned to America, arriving in New York on February 28, 1936. The manifest lists her as 36, married to James W Bellah, and living in Fairfield. Her father died in March 1936.

Bernice Vert's second and final marriage was to Andrew Tait, performed in 1942. The couple settled in Plainfield, New Jersey. She would remain in New Jersey until her death in 1972.

== Deaths ==
Bernice Tait (Vert) died on March 13, 1972, in Westfield, New Jersey. She was 71 when she died.

Her sister, Adrienne Elizabeth, died in South Wales, Australia, on March 4, 1970. She was 74 when she died.

Her first husband, James Warner Bellah, would die of a heart attack in Los Angeles, California, on September 22, 1976. He was 77 when he died.

Her second husband, Andrew Tait, would die of injuries from an auto accident on March 15, 1977. He was 71 he died.

Bernice's youngest son from her marriage to Bellah, James Bellah II, would die in December 2015. He had followed in his famous father's footsteps, becoming an "educator, actor, author, and veteran." He was 84 years old when he died.

== Myths ==
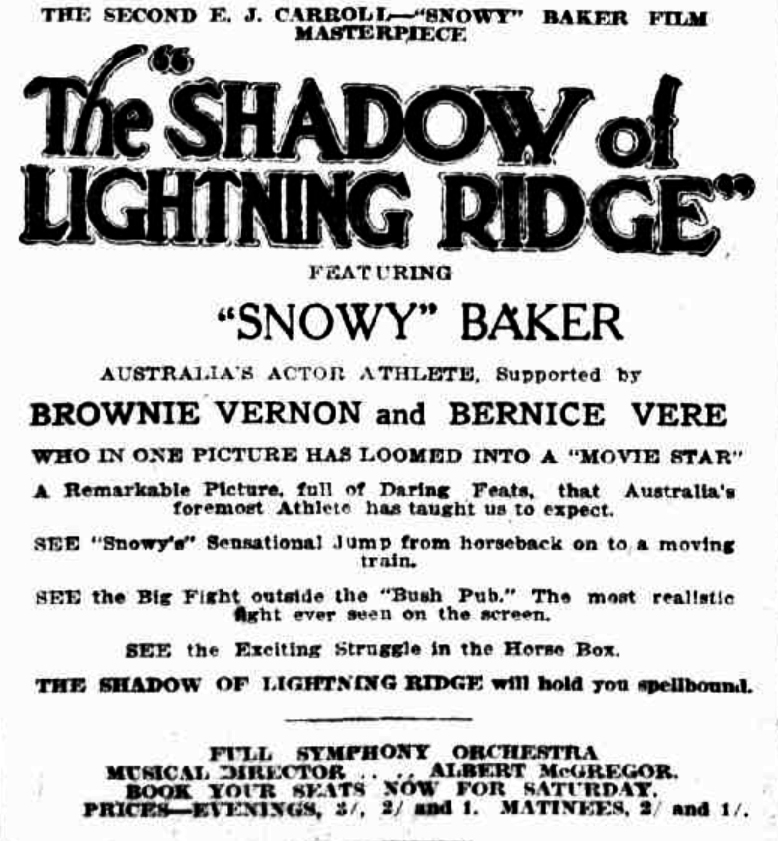
Australian Movie Ad

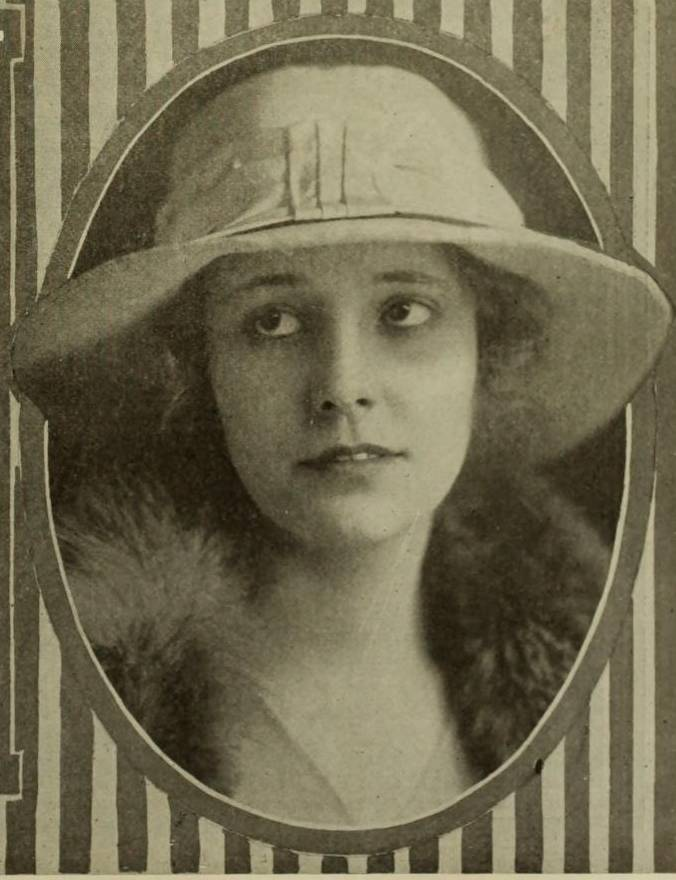
Brownie
Vernon

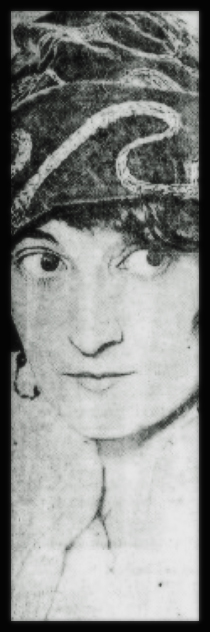
Bernice
Vere

Some reviewers have inferred Agnes "Brownie" Vernon changed her stage name to Bernice Vere to continue acting in Australian pictures. Many of Bernice Vere's movie credits were changed to Brownie Vernon in various movie databases. These are the facts:

Agnes "Brownie" Vernon acted in 3 Australian movies. The trio of films was released between 1920 and 1921:

- The Man from Kangaroo - produced by the Baker-Meredyth-Lucas consortium, was released on January 24, 1920. Brownie Vernon played Muriel Hammond.
- The Shadow of Lightning Ridge - produced by the Baker-Meredyth-Lucas was released on April 3, 1920. Brownie Vernon played "Dorothy Harden," and Bernice Vere played "Portuguese Annie," After completing The Shadow of Lightning Ridge, Agnes Vernon left Australia and headed back to California in May 1920.
- Silks and Saddles - produced by Commonwealth Pictures, directed by Brownie's husband John K. Wells, and released on March 5, 1921. Brownie Vernon played Bobbie Morton. Vernon had returned to Australia to make this film and spent the remainder of 1921 in Australia while her husband pursued business opportunities. Vernon's time in Australia during 1921 is the primary source of the Agnes Vernon/Bernice Vere controversy. Brownie and her husband sailed for California in March 1922.

Bernice Vere made four movies in Australia before heading to Hollywood in November 1921.

- The Shadow of Lightning Ridge was released on April 3, 1920. The newspaper ads credit both Brownie Vernon and Bernice Vere. All newspaper ads for the movie, giving credit to both actresses, should have ended this controversy.
- The Jackeroo of Coolabong was the last movie produced by the Baker-Meredyth-Lucas consortium and released on October 16, 1920. The Fighting Breed is the repackaged version of this movie made for US audiences and released on September 1, 1921. IMDb listing for The Jackeroo of Coolabong credits Bernice Vere as "the Moll." The American Film Institute gives no credit to Bernice Vere but lists Agnes Vernon in the cast. The AFI site also displays this qualifier "Various sources have expressed doubt that Brownie Vernon appeared in the film." The IMDb listing for The Fighting Breed mentioned neither actress. Bernice did receive a review from the Australian media for her performance in this film.
- The Betrayer was released on March 19, 1921, and directed by Beaumont Smith. Bernice Vere played Eleanor Barris. IMDb credits Agnes Vernon playing Eleanor Barris. The Australian media notes - In the March–April timeframe of 1921, Beaumont Smith took "from Sydney, a company of 12 actors and actresses, cameramen, and a full technical staff to New Zealand." The article also published a list of the actors, which included Bernice Vere, and emphasized that Beaumont Smith only used Australian actors for this film.
- The Blue Mountains Mystery was released on November 5, 1921. Bernice Vere played Pauline Tracey. Silent Era credits "Bernice Vere (Agnes Vernon)" as playing the part of Pauline Tracey. IMDb credits "Agnes Vernon as Pauline Tracey." The Australian media provided two reviews for Bernice Vere as shown above validating her part in the movie. In May 1922, the film was released in the US after changing the title to The Blue Mountain Mystery. According to an advertisement in the Motion Picture News, the movie featured John Faulkner, and Bernice Ware. The AFI record of the film shows Bernice Ware playing Pauline Tracey. None of Bernice Vere's silent movies survive.

Another myth — When war broke out, Mrs. Vera was in Germany. They told her it would be impossible to leave the country, but she refused to believe it. She declared that she could escape to England or Australia, but she didn't care. To prove it, she flipped a coin, and the coin said "Australia." And to Australia, she went. There is a reference (Australian and American media) alluding to Bernice Vert being in Germany when World War I started. The Great War began on July 28, 1914. Bernice had just turned 14. There are no supporting references for placing her in Germany when war broke out. The sole documentation available shows that in 1912, 11-year-old Bernice Vert emigrated from England to Australia.

== Filmography ==
This list is the filmography of Bernice Estelle Vert a.k.a. Bernice Vere. All films highlighted in green are films recut from the original Australian version to better play in the United States. Most of the films on this list are considered lost.

◆ Filmography of Bernice Vert ◆
Year	Title	Production	Distribution	Genre	Length	Released	Role	Dir
1920	The Shadow of Lightning Ridge	Carroll-Baker Prod	Carroll-Baker Prod	Western	Feature	1920-04-03	Portuguese Annie	Wilfred Lucas
1920	The Jackeroo of Coolabong	Carroll Bros	Carroll-Baker Prod	Western	Feature	1920-10-16	Unknown	Wilfred Lucas
1921	The Betrayer	Beaumont Smith Productions	Beaumont Smith	Drama	Feature	1921-03-19	Eleanor Barris	Beaumont Smith
1921	The Fighting Breed (1)	Selig-Rork	Aywon	Western	Feature	1921-9-1	Unknown	Wilfred Lucas
1921	The Shadow of Lightning Ridge (2)	Selig-Rork	Aywon	Drama	Feature	1921-09-13	Portuguese Annie	Wilfred Lucas
1921	The Blue Mountains Mystery	Carroll-Baker Prod	Carroll-Baker Prod	Drama	Feature	1921-11-05	Pauline Tracey	Raymond Longford
1922	Blue Mountain Mystery (3)	Southern Cross Picture Productions	Wid Gunning Inc	Drama	Feature	1922-05	Pauline Tracey	Raymond Longford
1928	Inspiration	Excellent Pictures	Excellent Pictures	Drama	Feature	1928-05-10	Anna Martin	Bernard McEveety
(1) The Fighting Breed is the repackaged version of The Jackeroo of Coolabong made for US audiences. (2) The Shadow of Lightning Ridge was repackaged for US audiences (3) Blue Mountain Mystery is the repackage version of The Blue Mountains Mystery made for US audiences.

== Sources ==
- Shirley, G.; Adams, B. (1983). Australian Cinema, the First Eighty Years. Angus & Robertson. ISBN 978-0-207-14581-0.
