= John K. Wells =

American director, producer, and writer

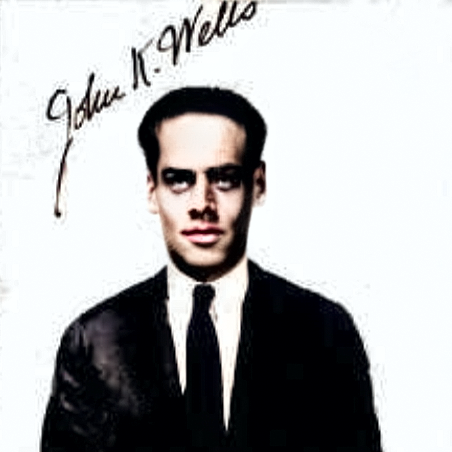
- John K. Wells 1919
- Born: John Kenneth Wells; July 2, 1886; Evanston, Illinois, U.S.
- Died: December 27, 1953 (aged 67); Los Angeles, California, U.S.
- Resting place: Greenwood Memorial Park
- Occupations: Actor; Director; Producer; Writer
- Years active: 1915–1923
- Known for: Queen of the Turf
- Spouse: Agnes Vernon (m. 1924; died 1948)

John K. Wells (July 2, 1886 – December 27, 1953) was an American actor, director, producer, and writer of the Silent film era. Wells was a 29-year old actor who earned his first credited role in the 1915 Universal short film — The Queen of Hearts.

Wells worked his way up the ranks at Universal, ultimately being promoted from Assistant Director to full-time Director in 1917. In 1919, Wells worked on the Universal movie serial — The Lion Man. After directing the first two chapters of the production, he quit his job. Wells booked passage and departed for Australia, hoping to participate in their burgeoning movie industry. In 1921, Wells hit his high water mark when he wrote, produced, and directed the Australian film — Silks and Saddles.

Wells and his wife, Agnes Vernon, returned to America in 1922. Wells partnered in a real estate brokerage firm in La Jolla, California. He briefly emerged in the publishing world when he published his novel — Rafter Romance in 1932. In 1933, RKO picked up the rights to Rafter Romance and made it the basis for two films produced in the 1930s — Rafter Romance and Living on Love.

John and Judith Wells continued to live in both California and Arizona until his wife died in 1948. (Note: Agnes Vernon went through several name changes during her life. She was born Agnes Vernon. In 1917, she changed her name to "Brownie" Vernon (based on her big brown eyes). In the early 20s, her final name change to — Judith Vernon Wells. Her San Diego death certificate is available from the Office of Vital Records, San Diego. The document reads as follows: Name: Judith Vernon Wells aka Mrs. Agnes Wells Died: Saturday, February 21, 1948, 01:00 PM Born: Friday, December 27, 1895, La Grande, Oregon Husband: John K. Wells Death: Myocarditis) Wells would die five years later in 1953. He was 67 when he died.

== Early years ==
John Wells's father, John Q. Wells, (c. 1849 – 1889) was born in New York. His mother, Josephine née Sherman (1855 – 1934) was born in Chicago. Josephine and John Q were married in Chicago on November 24, 1875. The 1880 census shows John Q Wells and Josephine living in Riverside, Illinois along with their two daughters Gracie, born in 1876, and Alice, born in 1879. The census lists John's occupation as "Real Estate." Coddington Wells was born in 1884 and John Kenneth Wells was born on July 2, 1886, in Evanston, Illinois. John Wells was one when his sister, Alice, died in 1887. Wells was 3 when his father died in 1889.

The 1900 census shows 44-year-old Josephine Wells is the widowed head of Household. The family consists of Josephine, her 16-year-old son Coddington and 14 -year-old son John K. They have a live-in servant while continuing to reside in Riverside, Illinois. Little is known of Wells's personal life after 1900 until he appears on a Universal lot.

== Career ==
=== Hollywood ===
It is unknown if Wells appeared in movies as an extra or in any uncredited roles before September 1915. John K. Wells first surfaced in the media with a credited role in the " William Worthington" short film - The Queen of Hearts released on September 14, 1915. The Universal production starring Herbert Rawlinson and Anna Little. This first movie role also initiates a relationship with William Worthington, which will bear fruit in the future. Finishing out 1915, Wells landed roles as a supporting actor in three more films, including the December production of As The Shadows Fall. This Worthington-directed project starred Herbert Rawlingson and Agnes Vernon. This film is the first time Wells appears in a movie with Agnes Vernon.

His last supporting role is in the 1916 production Darcy of the Northwest Mounted (Working title of "Bloodhounds of North,") released on May 16, 1916. This last film was another Worthington-directed film starred Herbert Rawlingson and Agnes Vernon.

June 16, 1916, sees the release of the short film — The False Part starring Herbert Rawlinson and Agnes Vernon. Universal promotes Wells to an assistant director and writer. He continues his relationship with the William Worthington company. In July 1917, Wells was promoted from William Worthington's assistant to the full-fledged Director.

An article in the Motion Picture News dated July 7, 1917, states, "Universal City has a new director in the person of Jack Wells, a former assistant of William Worthington. Mr Wells will make a number of additional releases to the series, "The Perils of the Secret Service . . ."

The August 9, 1919 issue of The Moving Picture World contained an article headlined "Mrs. Baker Selects Staff." The article states Mrs. Baker "has selected a staff of five film experts" to take to Australia to make films. Her selections included Howard Gaye as an assistant director. However, Gaye had several contractual obligations to Universal which he would have to abandon if he left. He postponed his decision until a few days before the group was to sail for Australia. He informed the American contingent he had decided to honor his universal contract. Who could replace Gayne on this short notice?

John K. Wells was working on a Universal serial The Lion Man featuring Kathleen O'Connor. He had two episodes finished and was working on the third. Wells somehow catches wind of Gayle's backing out of the Australian adventure and volunteers to replace him. John K. Wells became a last-minute replacement for Gaye, which explained Well's late application for a passport. (Note: This a duplicate of an attachment enclosed as part of John K. Wells's passport application State of California County of Los Angeles "As requested in the application for a passport, I wish to state that my business in Australia is in the nature of making motion pictures; Mr. R. L. Baker of Sydney, he is preparing to start operating a company to produce motion pictures in Australia, and it is to become the Assistant Director under Director Wilford Lucas, of this organization that I wish to make this trip. Mr. R. L. Baker, who is in the United States, sailed with the rest of the company on August 12, and the assistant Director going with them failed in his contract only a day or two before sailing. Upon seeing the party at the station, I was made an oral proposition which I was to consider and, if accepted, follow on the next boat. I have considered same and have communicated with them by wireless . . " Sign John K Wells August 29, 1919) Wells was an upgrade over Gaye since he was an experienced director and assistant director. Besides his qualifications, the opportunity to be close to Agnus while gaining exposure to the Australian film market greatly influenced his decision.

Given these opportunities, Wells decided to forgo contractual obligations to Universal, quit his Director's job, and set sail for Australia on September 9, 1919. (Note: The news article was titled "Miss O'Connor Directorless" and dated Sept. 17, 1919, Los Angeles "Jack Wells quit Universal and has gone to Australia. "Wells was directing "The Strange Case of Cavendish" Kathleen O'Connor's serial vehicle and the blonde beauty's first starring opportunity. Work has been held up pending the choice of a director. However, there is a rumor that the three episodes already filmed may be made into two-reel stories and the first part of the story refilmed." Later, Al Russel was selected as the replacement director.)

=== Australia ===
John K. Wells set sail for Sydney, Australia, and arrived on September 29, 1919. He would become involved in producing four films. The Australian adventure would be the directorial last hurrah for John Wells.

The first American contingent of film experts included Director Wilfred Lucas, his wife screenwriter Bess Meredyth Lucas, actress Brownie Vernon and Cinematographer John Doerrer and had arrived in Sydney on September 2, 1919. These professionals were personally recruited by Snowy Baker and approved by E. J. Carroll. They went to work immediately, beginning with Research and Location scouting.

- The Man from Kangaroo (Jan 1920)

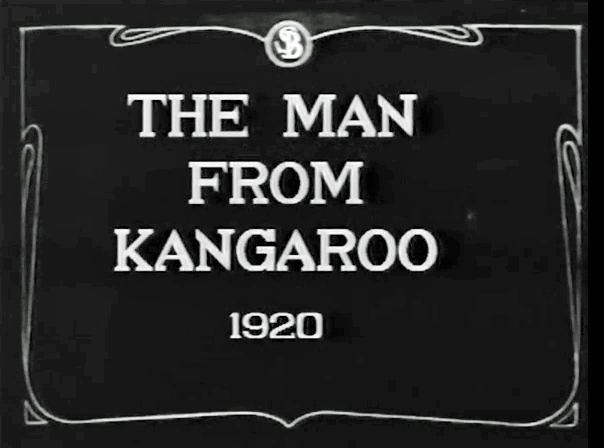
Opening title

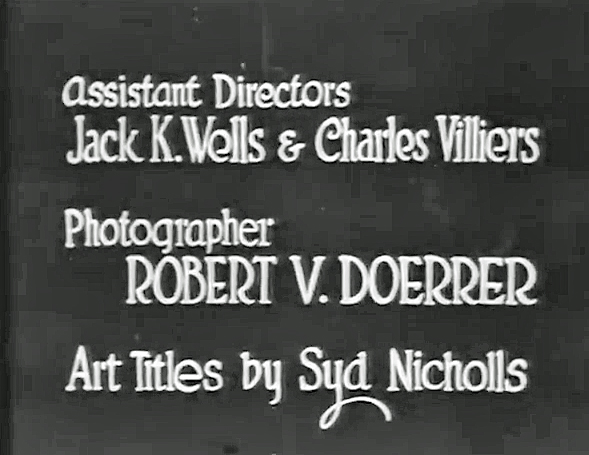
Screen credit for Jack Wells

The fruits of the Lucas contingent resulted in a trio of films. The first film was The Man from Kangaroo, released in Australia on January 24, 1920. The film featured Snowy Baker, directed by Wilfred Lucas and written by Bess Meredyth. The film's leading lady was Agnes Vernon. They list John Wells as one of the assistant directors and a film editor. The 73-minute feature film was produced by E. J. Carroll and Snowy Baker. The film was shot on location in Kangaroo Valley during September and October 1919. The film was a success at the box office. The movie was repackaged for the American market, renamed to The Better Man and premiered in New York on November 1, 1921. This was the only movie of the trio of Lucas films to survive.

- The Shadow of Lightning Ridge (Apr 1920)

The second film of the American troupe was "The Shadow of Lightning Ridge," released in Australia on April 3, 1920. The feature was directed by Wilfred Lucas and written by Bess Meredyth. The film's featured leads were Snowy Baker and Agnes Vernon. John Wells is listed as the assistant director. The seven-reel feature film was produced by E. J. Carroll and Snowy Baker and their production company, Carroll-Baker Australian Productions.

Filming started in early 1920 in the bush near Sydney, and at a studio built by E.J. Carroll. The film was well received in Australia and successful at the box office. The film was released in the U.S. under the same name on September 13, 1921, by William Selig and Aywon Film Corporation. It is considered a lost film.

The Carrolls folded their production company after completing this film. They said "Lack of Australian stories suitable for dramatization and the fact that oversea producers were releasing films more than sufficient for market needs had also forced him and his associates to abandon the production of films."

- The Jackeroo of Coolabong (Oct 1920)

On October 16, 1920, Wilfred Lucas released his last Australian film. Brownie Vernon departed Australia on April 17, 1920, and John Wells was not involved in the project. During filming, E. J. Carroll clashed with Lucas over the cost of films. Wilfred Lucas and crew returned to Hollywood, arriving in San Francisco on April 5, 1920 Wells remained in Australia to work on other projects.

- The Man from Snowy River (Aug 1920)

Since the Lucas collaboration had ended abruptly, Wells was searching for a project. He found an opportunity with the Australian company of Beaumont Smith's Productions. They were about to start production on a new film to be produced, directed, and written by Beaumont Smith. Smith offered Wells a chance to be a co-director, and Wells accepted.

Beaumont Smith had purchased the rights to a poem — The Man from Snowy River by Australian bush poet Banjo Paterson. He then spent two years developing a Screenplay for a film based on the poem. Shooting began in June 1920 in the Blue Mountains. The final result was the release of The Man from Snowy River on August 28, 1920. The film would feature Australia's own Cyril Mackay and Stella Southern. It is considered a lost film.

- Silks and Saddles (1921)

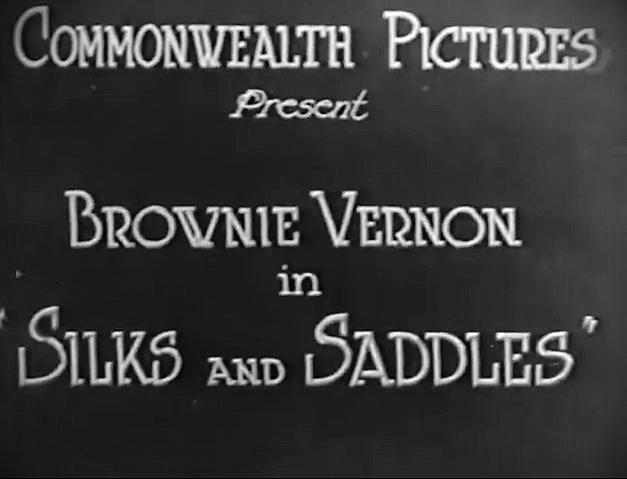
Opening title

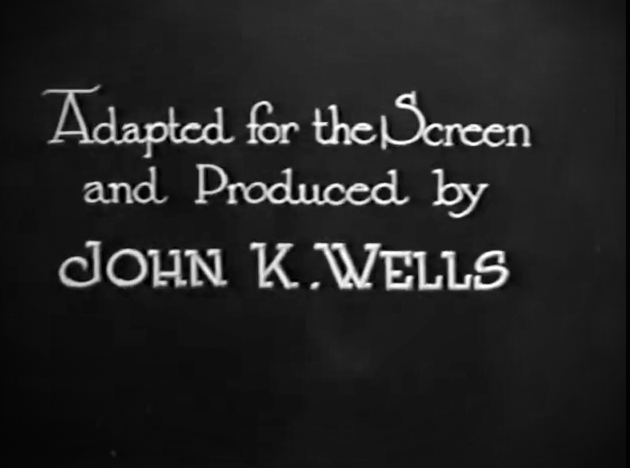
Screen credit for Jack Wells

Silks and Saddles was John K. Wells's big chance to reach for the brass ring. Wells wrote, directed, co-edited, and produced Silks and Saddles The movie featured Wells's wife Brownie Vernon and Robert MacKinnon. They set the film in the world of horse racing.

Newly formed Australian company, Commonwealth Pictures, and The Carroll Brothers provided funding of £5,600 (approximately $250,000 in today's money). The film was released on March 5, 1921, and garnered good reviews. The film would eventually gross £50,000 (over two million in today's U.S. money). The Americanized version of the movie was renamed Queen o' Turf or Queen of the Turf and released in the United States on April 16, 1922. The film is one of the rare Australian silent movies to survive today. This film was the final production for Wells. He would never direct another film.

An item in the Billboard dated November 21, 1921, reads:

"John K Wells, American picture producer and the husband of Brownie Vernon, recently framed up a singing act for vaudeville. He failed to make good and was closed after the first week."

=== 1922-1953 ===
John Wells and his wife booked passage on the S.S. Sonoma, arriving in San Francisco, California, on March 28, 1922. (Note: John and Judith Wells departed Sydney, Australia on March 8, 1922, aboard the SS Sonoma. They arrived in San Francisco, California, on March 28, 1922. They list her on the manifest as Judeth A. A. Vernon, age 26, single, and from San Diego, California. They list him as John K. Wells, age 34, married, and from Los Angeles, California.)

The Producers Security Corporation incorporated in 1919. They started actively recruited talent for their new company including John K. Wells in 1922. A piece of news in the Exhibitors Trade Review dated May 6, 1922, stated:

"John K. Wells, well-known Australian producer, before departing for Australia April 22 signed a contract for Producers Security to handle world's distribution of his entire output of pictures. Mr. Wells contemplates producing at least five features a year."

There no record of another trip to Australia in April 1922 or any Wells movies produced for Producers Security.

Wells decided to follow in his father's footsteps. In January 1925, the "California Directory of Brokers and Salesmen" posted John K. Wells establishing a corporation — Lathrop-Wells Inc. They become a Real Estate brokerage firm headquartered in La Jolla, California with the following officials:

• J.M. Lathrop	President
• John K. Wells	Vice President
• Judith A. Vernon	Secretary

The 1930 census shows John Wells is living in San Diego, working as a realtor.

=== Writer ===
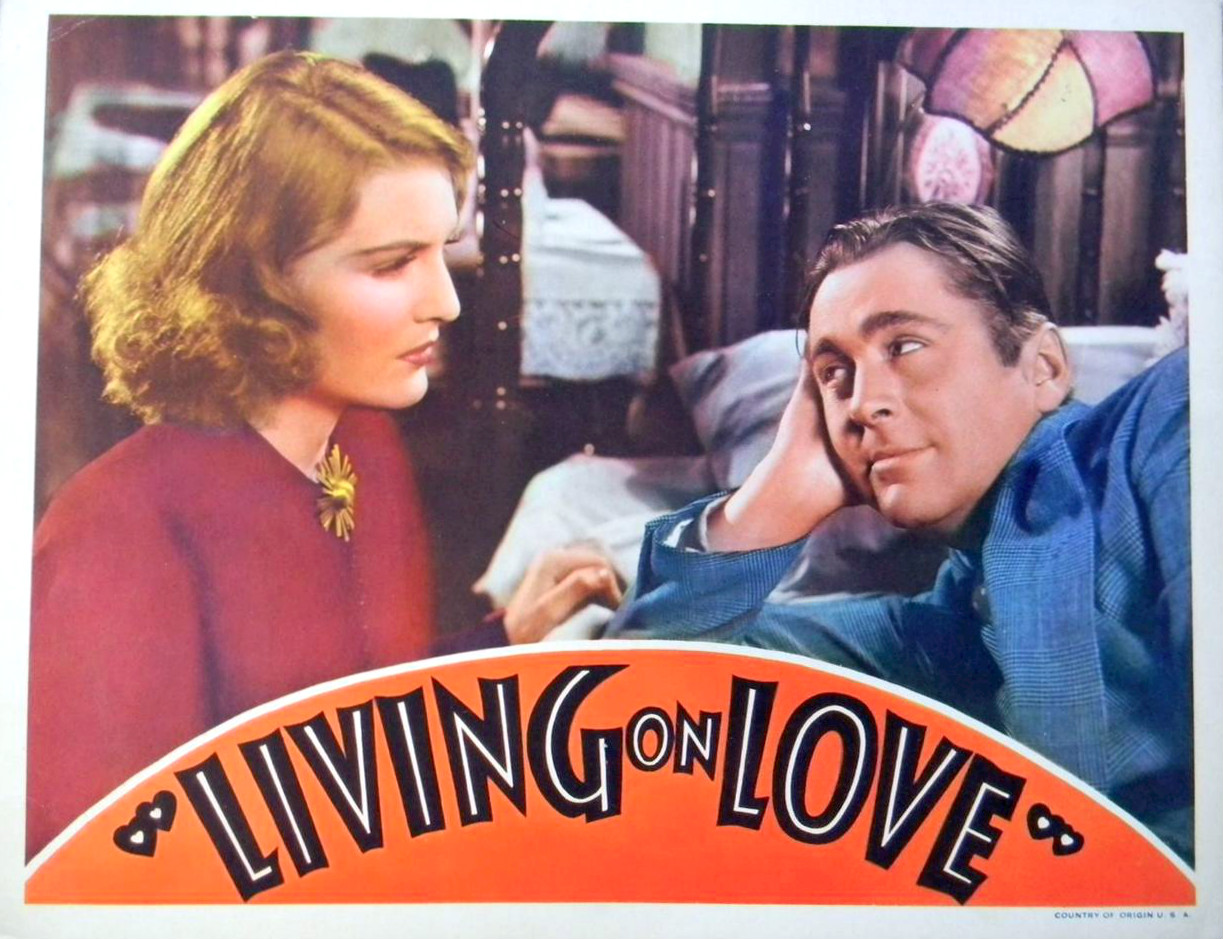
Living on Love Lobby Card

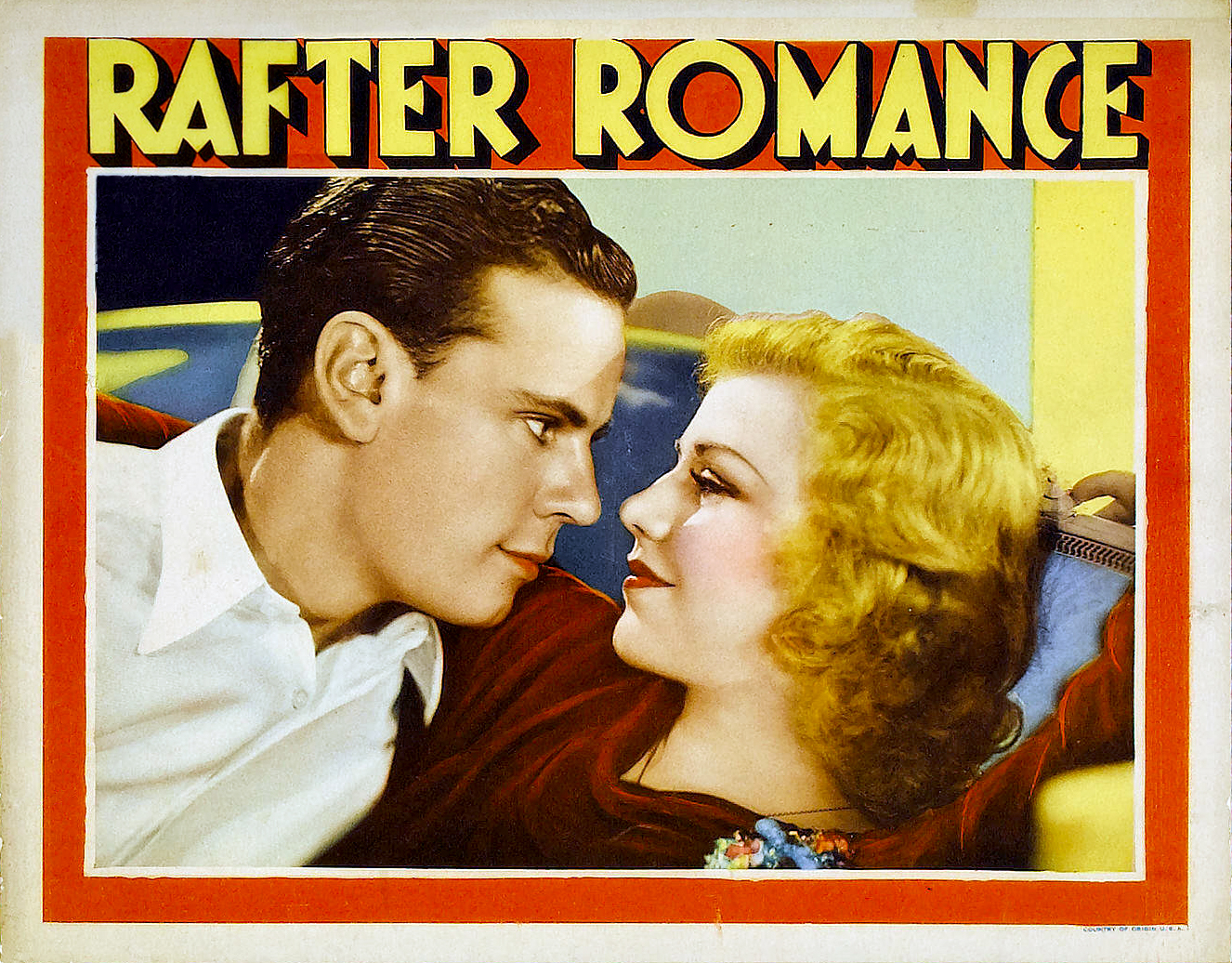
Rafter Romance Lobby Card

John Wells completed his novel Rafter Romance and the book was published by Brentano's in 1932.

RKO Pictures purchased the rights to the book and decided to produce a film based on the book. Production began in mid-June 1933, and Rafter Romance was released on September 1, 1933. This first iteration of Rafter Romance was directed by William A. Seiter with a cast consisting of Ginger Rogers, Norman Foster, and George Sidney. Four years after the release of Rafter Romance, RKO producer Merian C. Cooper decided to reissue the film. The new movie was renamed Living on Love and featured a cast of James Dunn, Whitney Bourne, and Joan Woodbury. Shooting started in August 1937, and the second iteration, directed by Lew Landers, was released on November 12, 1937.

== Marriage ==
A news article in Billboard, dated November 19, 1921, stated he was married to Brownie Vernon. The 1930 and 1940 Censuses bear this out. also verifies marriage. John Wells was married to Judith Vernon Wells née Agnes Vernon for 27 years. There were no children.

== Deaths ==
John and Judith (Agnes Vernon) Wells were living in Phoenix, Arizona when she became ill. Due to her health condition, Judith relocated to her parents' residence in La Jolla, California. She died on Saturday, February 21, 1948, due to heart complications. She was 52. Her obituary does not make any reference to an acting career.

On Sunday, December 27, 1953, John K. Wells, died of a heart attack in Glendale, California. He was 67 years old. Wells had formerly been in charge of publications for the Church of Christ, Scientists in Arizona and currently worked as a sales representative for the Arizona radio station KTAR. There was no mention of any Hollywood connections in his obituary. John Wells was entombed in San Diego, California's Greenwood Memorial Park Mausoleum. His mausoleum plaque reads: John K. Wells 1895 - 1953.

== Filmography ==
◆ Filmography of John K. Wells ◆
Released	Title	Director	Male Lead	Female Lead	Genre	Length	Distribution	Notes
ACTOR
Sep 15 1915	The Queen of Hearts	Worthington	Rawlingson	Little	Drama	Short	Universal	
Nov 09 1916	On the Level	Worthington	Rawlingson	Jean Taylor	Drama	Short	Universal	
Dec 10 1915	The Power of Fascination	Madison	Holt	Madison	Drama	Short	Universal	
Dec 28 1915	As The Shadows Fall	Worthington	Rawlingson	Vernon	Drama	Short	Universal	
May 16, 1916	Darcy of the Northwest Mounted	Worthington	Rawlingson	Vernon	Drama	Short	Universal	
May 05 1932	Night World	Hobart Henley	Lew Ayres	Mae Clarke	Drama	Feature	Universal	
ASSISTANT DIRECTOR
Jun 20 1916	The False Part	Worthington	Rawlingson	Vernon	Drama	Short	Universal	
Jan 24 1920	The Man from Kangaroo	Lucas	Baker	Vernon	Western	Feature	CBAP	(Note: The Better Man was new title of the Americanized version of the Australian film — The Man from Kangaroo. Selig-Rork Production Company released the repackaged version to American audiences on November 26, 1921. This picture is registered in The National Film Preservation Board (NFPB) list of Lost U.S. Silent Feature Films.)
Apr 03 1920	The Shadow of Lightning Ridge	Lucas	Baker	Vernon	Drama	Feature	CBAP	(Note: The repackaged version of The Shadow of Lightning Ridge was released to American audiences on Mar 5, 1921, by Selig-Rork Production Company. The film is considered lost.)
DIRECTOR
Sep 14 1917	The Master Spy (eps 8)	Wells	Benedict	Anderson	Drama	Short	Universal	(Note: The article in the Moving Picture World dated July 14, 1917 reads, "Jack Wells, who formerly served as William Worthington's assistant at Universal, has been promoted on account of his ability to a directorship and is now directing a serial with Kinsley Benedict as his featured player. "The Perils of the Secret Service" was a 9-part serial produced by Universal. The first part was "The Last Cigarette" released on March 9, 1917. The first seven episodes were directed by George Bronson Howard. The final two episodes - "The Master Spy" released on September 25, 1917, and "The Mysterious Iron Ring" released on October 30, 1917, were directed by Wells. The serial followed the exploits of super spy Yorke Norroy.)
Oct 19 1917	The Mysterious Iron Ring (eps 9)	Wells	Benedict	Schade	Drama	Short	Universal	
Aug 3 1918	The Human Target	Wells	Benedict	Du Brey	Western	Short	Universal	
Dec 29 1919	The Lion Man	Russell & Wells	Perrin	O'Connor	Drama	Serial	Universal	
Aug 20 1920	The Man from Snowy River	Smith & Wells	Ordel	Southern	Drama	Feature	Smith Prod	.
Mar 05 1921	Silks and Saddles	Wells	Cosgrove	Vernon	Drama	Feature	Commonwealth	(Note: The Americanized version of Silks and Saddles, was renamed to "Queen o' Turf" or "Queen of the Turf" and the repackaged version was released to American audiences on April 16, 1922, by Robertson-Cole Pictures Corp)
PRODUCER
Sep 14 1917	The Master Spy (eps 8)	Wells	Benedict	Anderson	Drama	Short	Universal	
Oct 19 1917	The Mysterious Iron Ring (eps 9)	Wells	Benedict	Schade	Drama	Short	Universal	
Dec 29 1919	The Lion Man	Russell & Wells	Perrin	O'Connor	Drama	Serial	Universal	
Mar 05 1921	Silks and Saddles	Wells	Cosgrove	Vernon	Drama	Feature	Commonwealth	
WRITER
Jun 10 1916	The False Part	Worthington	Rawlingson	Vernon	Drama	Short	Universal	
Mar 05 1921	Silks and Saddles	Wells	Cosgrove	Vernon	Drama	Feature	Commonwealth	
Sep 04 1933	Rafter Romance	Seiter	Foster	Rodgers	Musical	Feature	RKO	
Nov 12 1937	Living on Love	Landers	Dunn	Bourne	Drama	Feature	RKO	

== Gallery ==
Personalities mentioned in this article

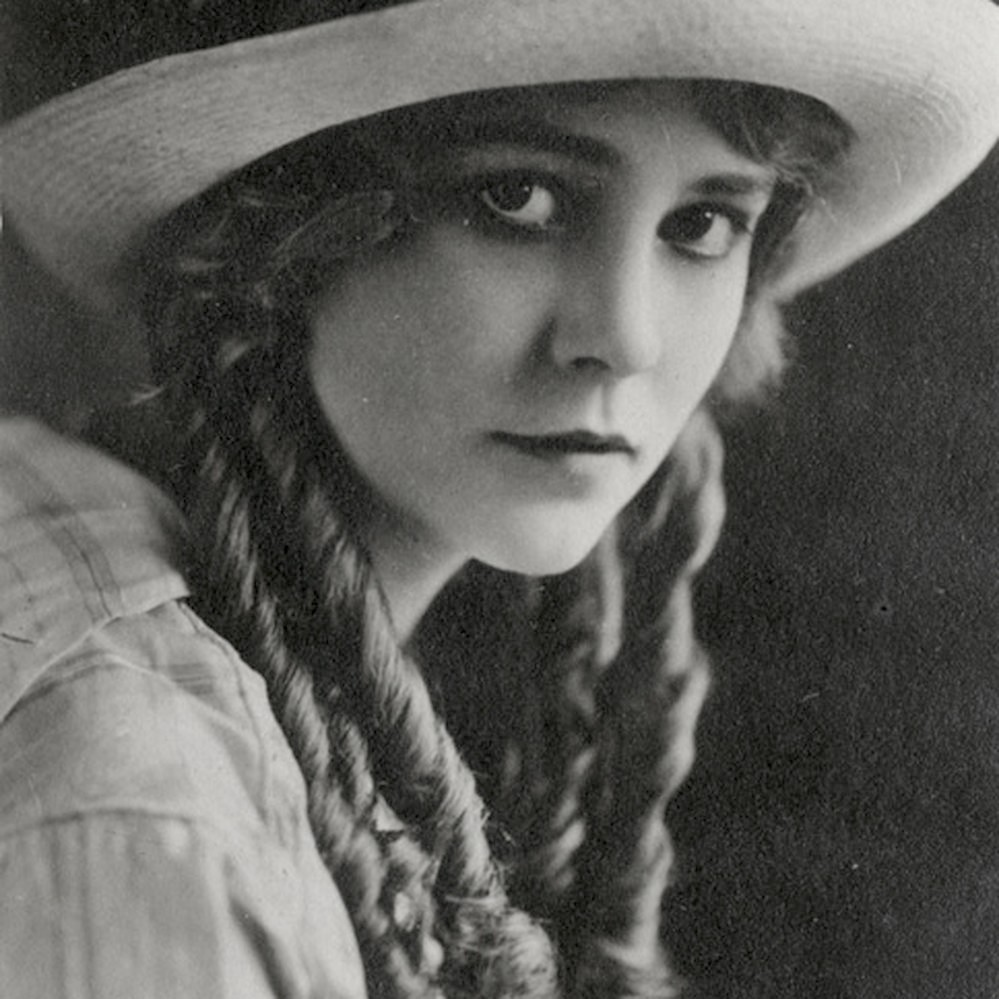
Agnes Vernon 1916

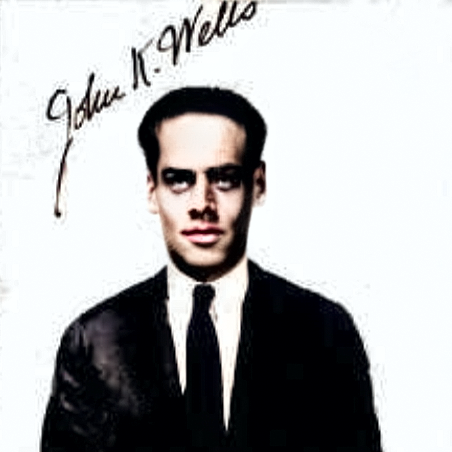
John K. Wells 1919

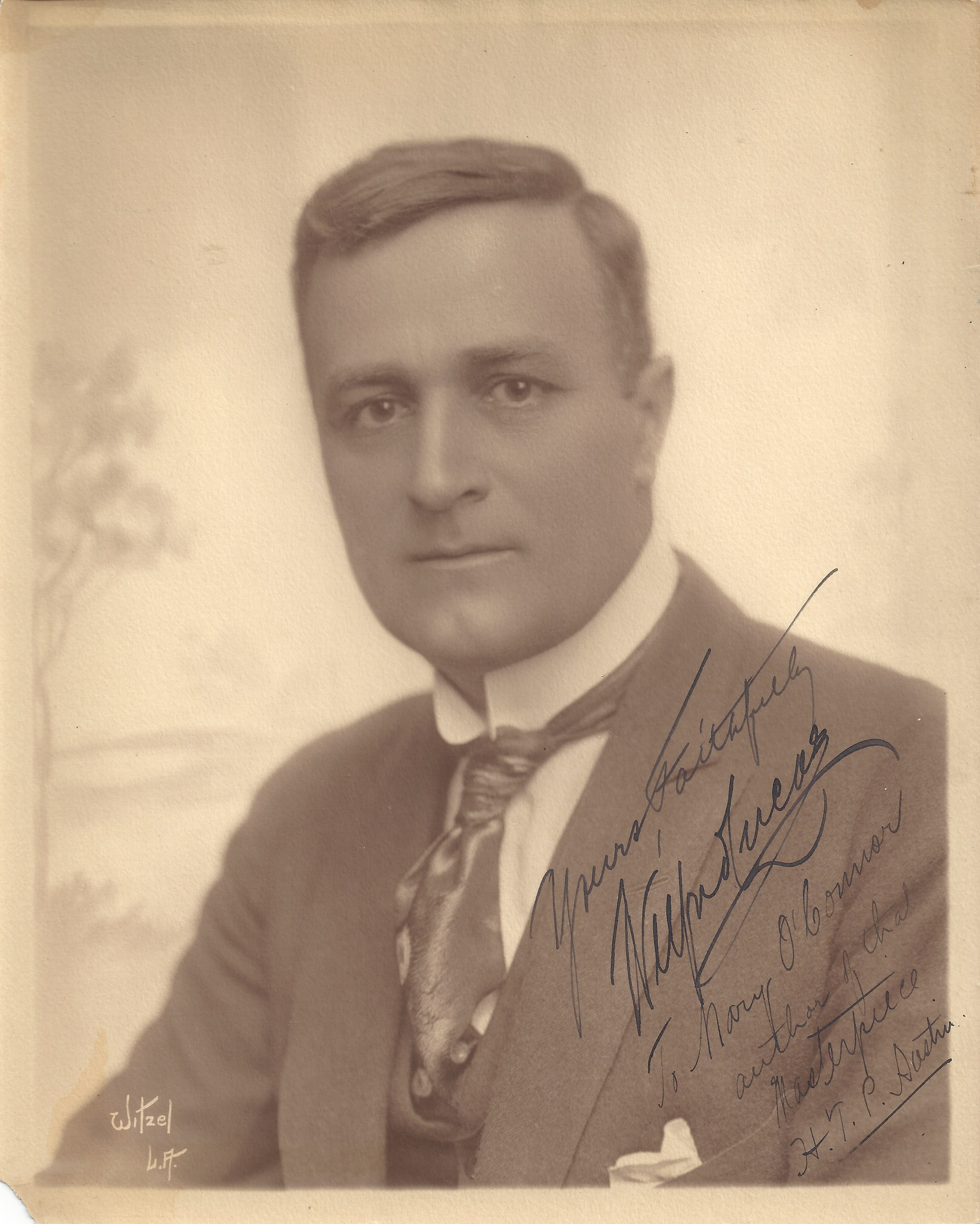
Wilfred Lucas

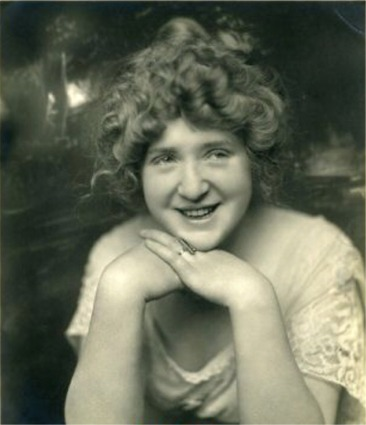
Bess Meredyth

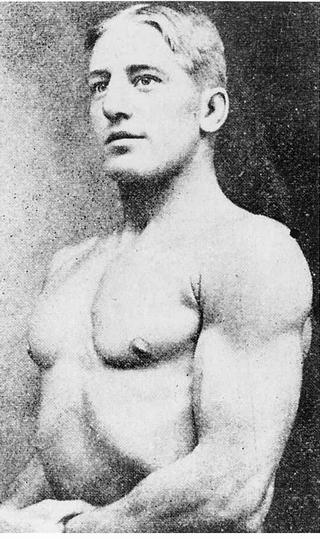
Snowy Baker

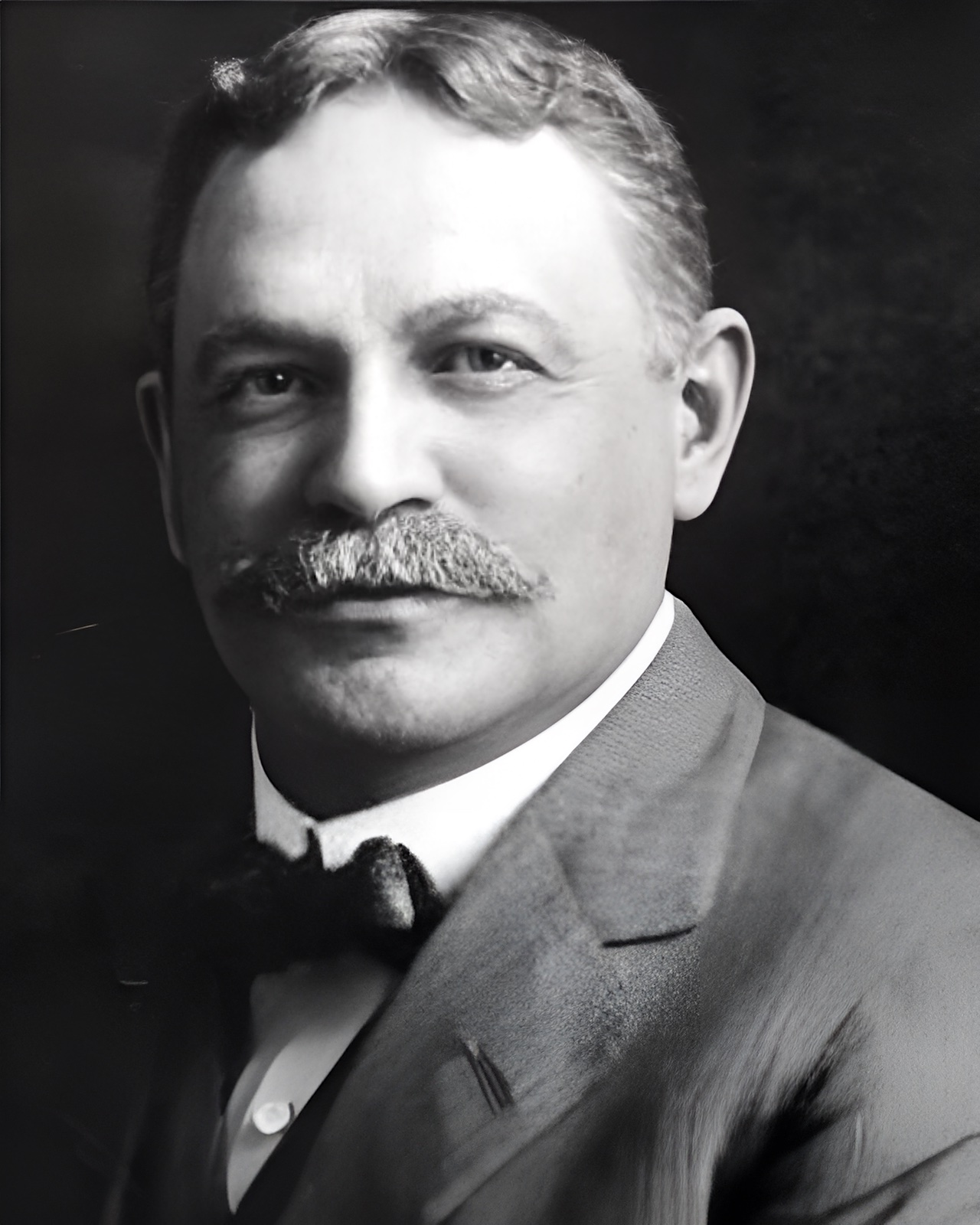
William Selig
Australian newspaper ads for movies cited in this article
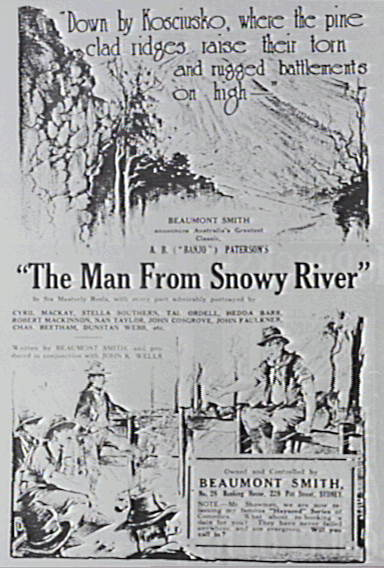
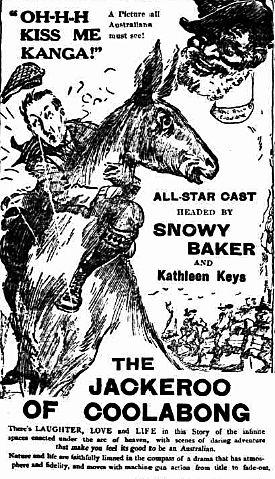
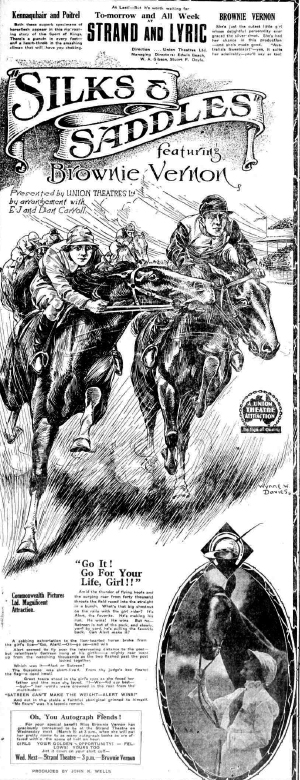

== Sources ==
- Pike, Andrew; Cooper, Ross (1980). Australian Film, 1900-1977: A Guide to Feature Film Production. Melbourne Oxford University Press. ISBN 978-0-19-554213-4.
- Braff, Richard E. (1999). The Universal Silents 1912-1929. Jefferson, North Carolina: McFarland & Company, Inc. p. 675. ISBN 0-7864-0287-3. "A filmography of the Universal Picture Manufacturing Company, 1912-1929"
- Wells, John (1932). Rafter Romance. New York: Brentano's.

◆ IMDb Listings Filmography ◆ "The content on IMDb is user-generated, and the site is considered unreliable by a majority of editors." This table provides a quick reference and is not used as a source in this article
1915 As The Shadows Fall	1915 The Power of Fascination	1915 The Queen of Hearts
1916 Darcy of the Northwest Mounted	1916 On the Level	1916 The False Part
1917 The Master Spy (eps 8)	1917 The Mysterious Iron Ring (eps 9)	1918 The Human Target
1919 The Lion Man	1920 The Man from Kangaroo	1920 The Man from Snowy River
1920 The Shadow of Lightning Ridge	1921 Silks and Saddles	1932 Night World
1933 Rafter Romance	1937 Living on Love	1917 Perils of the Secret Service
