= The Orange Leader =

The Orange Leader may refer to:

- The Orange Leader (Texas), a newspaper in the United States
- The Orange Leader (New South Wales), later The Leader, a defunct newspaper of Australia
