= The Man from Kangaroo =

1920 film

- Theatrical release poster
- Directed by: Wilfred Lucas
- Written by: Bess Meredyth
- Produced by: E. J. Carroll; Snowy Baker
- Starring: Snowy Baker; Agnes Vernon
- Cinematography: Robert V. Doerrer
- Edited by: John K. Wells
- Production company: Carroll-Baker Australian Productions
- Release dates: January 24, 1920 (Australia); November 26, 1921 (United States)
- Running time: 72 minutes
- Country: Australia
- Languages: English intertitles; art titles Syd Nicholls

The Man from Kangaroo is a 1920 Australian silent film starring renowned Australian sportsman Snowy Baker. It was the first of several films he made with the husband and wife team of director Wilfred Lucas and writer Bess Meredyth, both of whom had been imported from Hollywood by E. J. Carroll.

== Plot ==
John Harland is a former boxer turned reverend posted to the town of Kangaroo in Australia. He falls in love with Muriel, an orphaned heiress, and discovers that her guardian Martin Giles is embezzling her inheritance. Harland earns the ire of parishioners by teaching young boys to box, and Giles manipulates local opinion to have the bishop remove him.

Harland rescues a gentleman from a mugging in Sydney who suggests that he go to Kalmaroo where a criminal gang has driven the church out of the area. Harland preaches, and unexpectedly sees Muriel in the congregation; her property is near Kalmaroo.

But her overseer is Red Jack Braggan who leads the gang which violently breaks up Harland's mission – much to the distress of Muriel who regards Harland as too timid – and is in cahoots with Giles. Harland goes to work as a station hand at a property neighbouring Muriel's.

Giles arranges for Red Jack to kidnap Muriel so that he might marry the girl and thus prevent her giving evidence against him. Harland rescues Muriel: they leap from the stage coach as it thunders across Hampden Bridge into the Kangaroo River.

== Cast ==
Actor	Role
Snowy Baker	John Harland
Charles Villiers	Martin Giles
Brownie Vernon	Muriel Hammond
Wilfred Lucas	Red Jack Braggan
Walter Vincent	Ezra Peters
Malcolm MacKellar	Forman
Stuart Macrae	

== Development ==
Smith's Weekly 4 October 1919

Baker visited Hollywood in 1918 to shoot additional scenes for his second feature, The Lure of the Bush, and to study production methods.

With E. J. Carroll he arranged to bring back a team of Americans to assist them in making movies in Australia, including director Wilfred Lucas, his wife, screenwriter Bess Meredyth, actor Brownie Vernon, assistant director John K. Wells and cinematographer John Doerrer. This was announced in August 1919. The Sunday Times said "The policy of the promoters is to present purely Australian films, clean, wholesome stories, depicting our station and bush life, and, as far as possible, to form entire casts from Australians."

Lucas and the others arrived in Australia on 2 September 1919. Lucas announced his first film would be about bush life and would be shot on a station.

Meredyth spent a few months in the Mitchell Library in Sydney looking for topics to make movies about. It was later stated at the Royal Commission on the Moving Picture Industry in Australia that Meredyth felt "the only truly national subject about which producers could make a picture [in Australia] was horse racing. Australians, she said, had not yet developed any distinctive individuality of national character or tradition." This is what prompted the Carrolls to make all their films with Lucas and Baker about bush and station life.

Carroll-Baker Productions was formed in 1919 with a capital of £25,000 between E. J. Carroll, his brother Dan, Snowy Baker and the Southern Cross Feature Film Company. Said Dan Carroll at the time:

It Is not our intention to make any one subject which will not be of such a standard that it cannot be market ed in every English-speaking country in the world. With this ambition in view we are proud enough to think that we are being of national service to our own beloved Australia.

They bought a house, "Palmerston" in the Sydney suburb at Waverley and converted it into a studio. They ultimately made only two more films, The Shadow of Lightning Ridge (1920) and The Jackeroo of Coolabong (1920).

== Shooting ==
The film was shot on location in Kangaroo Valley and Gunnedah, with interiors at the Theatre Royal in Sydney during September and October 1919.

== Reception ==
The film was a success at the box office.

The Sun said "Mr. Baker is never more natural, and consequently never seen to better advantage than when he is boxing, whether in fun or in grim earnest, riding a buckjumper, steeplechasing across country, imitating tho porpoise in a swimming pool, or making somersault dives from a great height.... As an actor, pure and simple, he has considerable head way yet to make."

Table Talk thought "The picture is just a trifle too long drawn out, and consequently the interest is inclined to lag a little in parts. Tills is where a little judicious editing would work an improvement."

The magazine The Lone Hand dated 24 February 1920 said the film was:

. . . exceedingly good. Naturally the picture abounds in faults... One of the most obvious of these faults is the tendency, whether directly or indirectly, to boost the star, “Snowy” Baker, not as a moving picture actor, but as an athlete, a pugilist, and in fact in every form of physical culture of which he is capable... Nor does “Snowy” exactly fit into the role of a parson with his massive athlete's shoulders and his square, heavy jaw. It is when he throws aside his “cloth” and adopts the role of bushman that he shines, and then indeed, does he perform some amazing stunts of which even the redoubtable “Doug.” would be proud...The story, from a dramatic point of view, lacks interest, it being obvious that the plot has been woven with a view to giving the star full rein to exhibit his equestrian abilities, and this rather destroys the possibilities for the romantic element, so satisfying to the public taste.
