= Central Western Daily =

Australian regional newspaper

- Type: Weekly newspaper
- Format: Tabloid
- Owner: Australian Community Media
- Founded: 1945
- Headquarters: Kite Street, Orange
- Website: centralwesterndaily.com.au

The Central Western Daily newspaper (also known as the Western Daily) was founded in 1945 in Orange in the Central West region of New South Wales, its first edition being published on 3 October 1945.

It followed a range of earlier publications from Orange, including The Advocate and The Leader (also known as the Orange Leader). The range of newspapers published in Orange were celebrated in 1961, with a centenary edition, which acknowledged the original newspaper: Western Examiner and Orange, Molong, Wellington, Dubbo, and Lachlan Advertiser originally published on 7 December 1861.

In the early 1950s it was complimented for its welcoming attitude to New Australians and quoted for its contributions.

It was also regularly quoted by other New South Wales regional newspapers for stories and humorous items.

It was also target in the correspondence columns of regional rivals within New South Wales, either by location or newspaper. It has also been known as the "Western News" in terms of the region it is in New South Wales.

Until February 2025, it was sold six mornings per week, from Monday to Saturday. The focus of the Central Western Daily is community news and issues and stories about local people; however, it also contains regional, national and world news.

Mostly the newspaper ranges from a minimum of 28 pages up to 68 pages on a Saturday. The average daily circulation is approximately 6,000 units.

Earlier runs of the publication are available online and microfilm.

In February 2025, Australian Community Media reduced the printed edition to weekly.
