= The Trouper =

1922 film

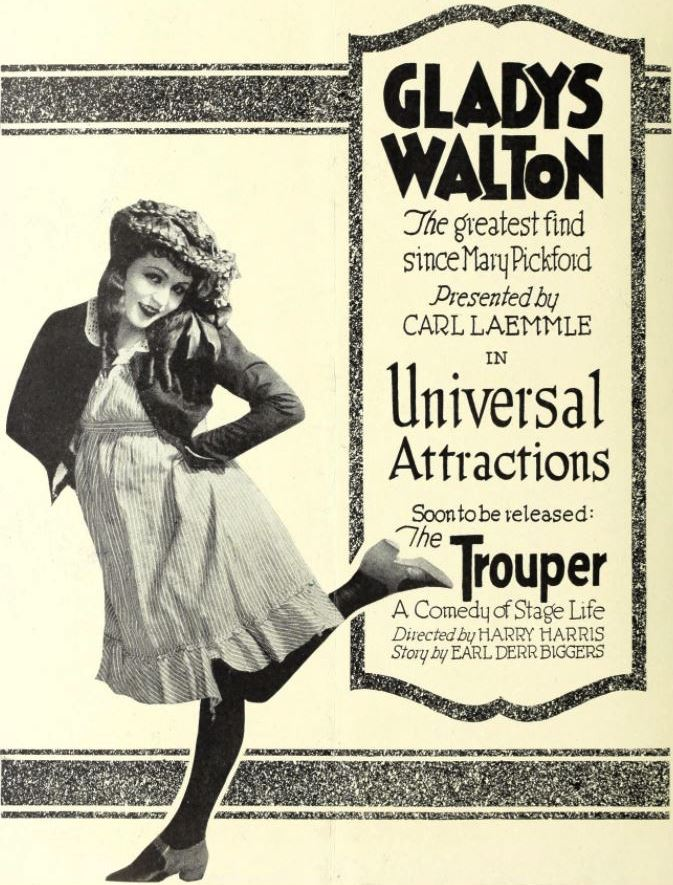
- Advertisement
- Directed by: Harry B. Harris
- Screenplay by: Andrew Percival Younger
- Story by: Andrew Percival Younger
- Produced by: Carl Laemmle
- Starring: Gladys Walton; Jack Perrin; Thomas Holding; Kathleen O'Connor; Roscoe Karns; Mary Philbin
- Cinematography: Earl M. Ellis
- Production company: Universal Film Manufacturing Company
- Distributed by: Universal Film Manufacturing Company
- Release date: July 23, 1922
- Running time: 50 minutes
- Country: United States
- Language: Silent (English intertitles)

The Trouper is a 1922 American silent comedy-drama film directed by Harry B. Harris and starring Gladys Walton, Jack Perrin, Thomas Holding, Kathleen O'Connor, Roscoe Karns, and Mary Philbin. The film was released by Universal Film Manufacturing Company on July 23, 1922.

== Cast ==
- Gladys Walton as Mamie Judd
- Jack Perrin as Herman Jenks
- Thomas Holding as Frank Kramer
- Kathleen O'Connor as Irene La Rue
- Roscoe Karns as Neal Selden
- Mary Philbin as Mary Lee
- Mary True as Minnie Brown
- Tom Guise as Warren Selden (credited as Tom S. Guise)
- Florence Lee as Mrs. Selden (credited as Florence D. Lee)

== Preservation ==
With no prints of The Trouper located in any film archives, it is a lost film.
