= Silks and Saddles (1921 film) =

1921 film

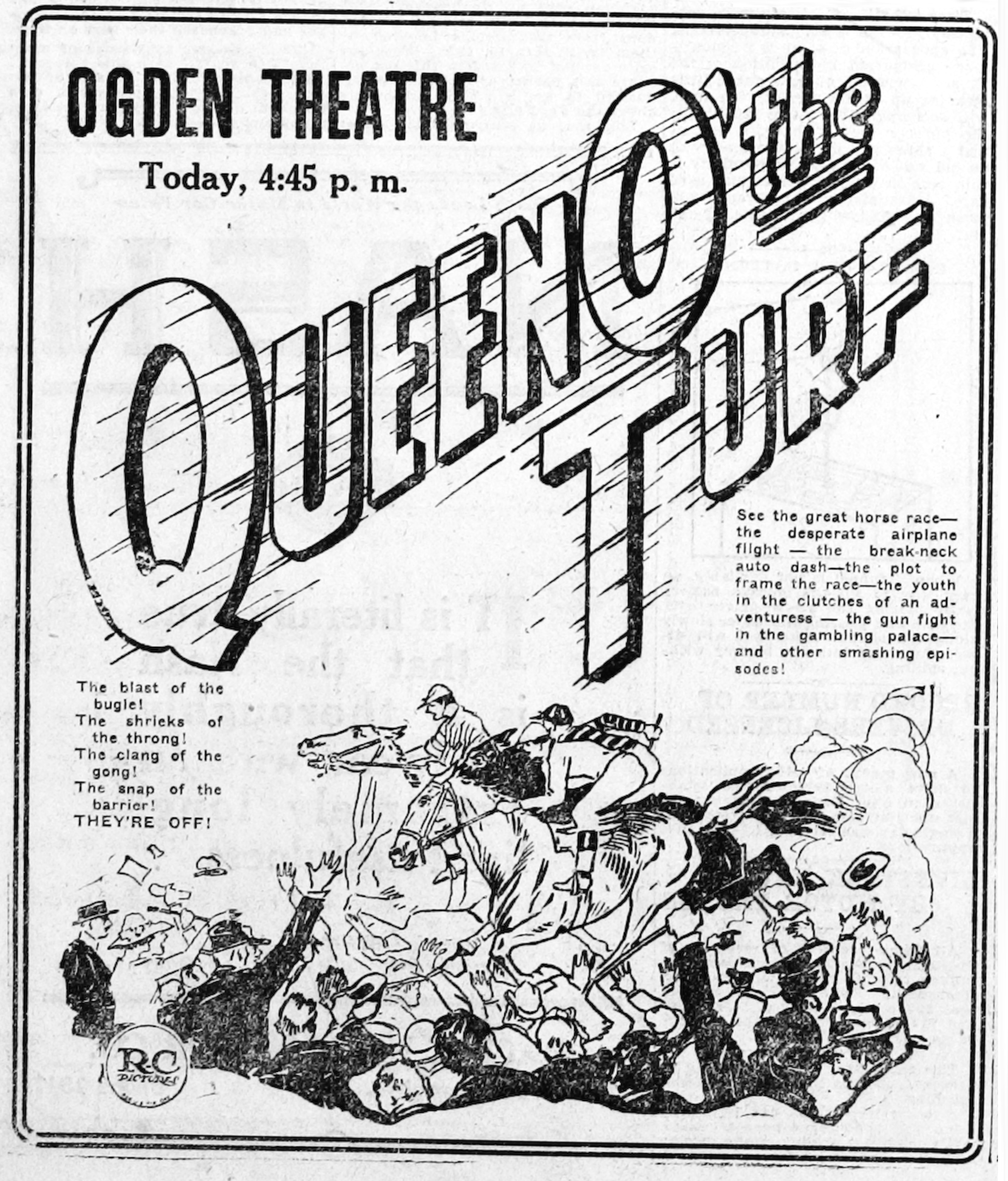
- Newspaper advertisement for the American release.
- Directed by: John K. Wells
- Written by: John K. Wells
- Based on: story by John Cosgrove
- Produced by: John K. Wells
- Starring: Brownie Vernon; Robert MacKinnon
- Cinematography: Alfred William Burne
- Edited by: Robert Bates; John K. Wells
- Production company: Commonwealth Pictures
- Distributed by: The Carroll Brothers
- Release date: 5 March 1921
- Running time: 5,500 feet
- Country: Australia
- Language: Silent (English intertitles)
- Budget: £5,600
- Box office: £50,000

Silks and Saddles is a 1921 Australian silent film set in the world of horse racing that was directed by John K. Wells.

The film was titled Queen o' Turf or Queen of the Turf for release in the United States.

== Plot summary ==
On the stud farm of Kangarooie, squatter's daughter Bobbie wants her weak brother Richard to come home for her birthday, but he prefers the charms of the city, in particular the high society adventuress, Mrs Fane. Dennis O'Hara, who is in love with Bobbie, persuades Richard to come home and he brings Mrs Fane with him. O'Hara gives Bobbie his horse, Alert, as a present. Bobbie enters it in a race and Mrs Fane tries to stop her from winning. Bobbie falls in love with a handsome man and rides Alert to victory.

== Cast ==
- Brownie Vernon as Bobbie Morton
- Robert MacKinnon as Richard Morton Jr
- John Cosgrove as Dennis O'Hara
- John Faulkner as Richard Morton Sr
- Tal Ordell as Phillip Droone
- Evelyn Johnson as Myra Fane
- Raymond Lawrence as Jeffrey Manners
- Gerald Harcourt as Toby Makin
- Tommy Denman as Dingo
- Kennaquhair (horse) as Alert

== Production ==
The film survives today almost in its entirety. It was made by Commonwealth Pictures, with Eric Griffin as managing director. The company was formed in October 1920 with capital of £10,000. The company hired John K. Wells to direct; he was an American who moved to Australia with Wilfred Lucas to work as an assistant director.

The film was shot in and around Sydney, including at Randwick racecourse and at Camden, with interiors at E. J. Carroll's studio at Palmerston in Waverley. Footage was taken involving an aeroplane, one of the first Australian films to do so. The champion race horse Kennaquhair appears.

== Reception ==
Le Maistre Walker, who helped set up Commonwealth Pictures, later claimed the film earned £17,000 in Australasia, of which only £3,900 was returned to the company. The UK rights were sold for £3,000 and the American rights for $16,000. Walker stated that the US distributors made £30,000 out of the film. However, because of the associated costs, Commonwealth could only return 23 shillings of every £1 invested, and soon went out of business.

The film was reportedly the victim of block booking practices in the Britain, where the dominant releases were from the US. It was re-titled for release in the US and edited to make it seem as if it was set in Virginia. Wells failed to get backing for another production, and returned to the US in March 1923.
