= The Betrayer =

1921 film

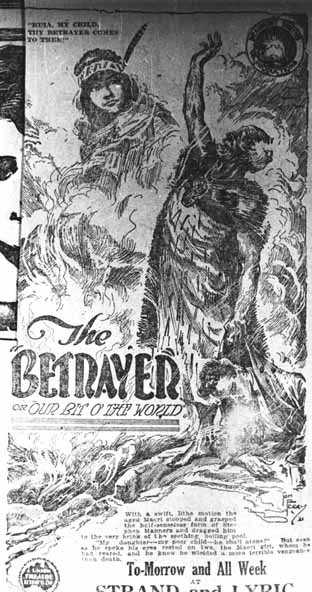
- Original newspaper advertisement
- Directed by: Beaumont Smith
- Written by: Beaumont Smith
- Produced by: Beaumont Smith
- Starring: Stella Southern
- Cinematography: Lacey Percival
- Production company: Beaumont Smith Productions
- Distributed by: Beaumont Smith
- Release date: 19 March 1921
- Running time: 5,500 feet
- Countries: Australia; New Zealand
- Language: English

The Betrayer is a 1921 Australian-New Zealand lost film from director Beaumont Smith about an interracial romance between a white Australian man and a Māori girl.

== Plot ==
Australian Stephen Manners (Cyril Mackay) travels to New Zealand and has sex with a Māori girl. He goes home and she dies giving birth to their daughter, Iwa. Iwa is raised by her grandfather Hauraki (Mita), who explains to Manners what happens when he returns to New Zealand twenty years later. Manners takes Iwa (now played by Stella Southern) back to Sydney, Australia, but does not tell her that he is her father.

Travelling with Manners is John Barris (John Cosgrove), whom Hauraki tells on his deathbed that Iwa's real father is a missionary, not Manners. Barris keeps this information to himself and makes advances on Iwa, which are stopped by Manners.

Iwa tells Manners she is in love with him, so Manner explains he is her father and she returns to Rotorua. Barris' wife (Bernice Vere) tells Manners the truth so he returns to New Zealand and is reunited with Iwa, this time as a romantic couple.

== Cast ==
- Stella Southern as Iwa
- Cyril Mackay as Stephen Manners
- John Cosgrove as John Barris
- Marie D'Alton as Mrs Manners
- Mita, Chief of the Arawa as Hauraki
- Bernice Vere as Eleanor Barris
- Maggie/Bella Papakura
- Guide Susan
- Herbert Lee
- Raymond Hatton
- Dunstan Webb

== Production ==
The film was shot on location in Rotorua and Auckland, New Zealand, at Coogee Beach and the Wentworth Hotel in Sydney, with about twelve cast and crew. Among them was Smith's assistant, Rudall Hayward, who later became one of New Zealand's most prolific directors.

Most stories of interracial romance at this time ended unhappily but this one finished with a white man marrying a Māori woman.

== Release ==
The movie was originally entitled Our Bit o' the World, but this was changed out of fear audiences would think it was a travelogue.

In 1922, Smith re-edited the film for the British market, adding a racecourse scene and a chase between a car and a train, probably taken from his earlier movie, Desert Gold (1919). He retitled the movie The Maid of Maoriland, a title under which the film was re-released in Australia.
