= Prince Edward Theatre (Sydney) =

Coordinates: 33.8733°S 151.2091°E

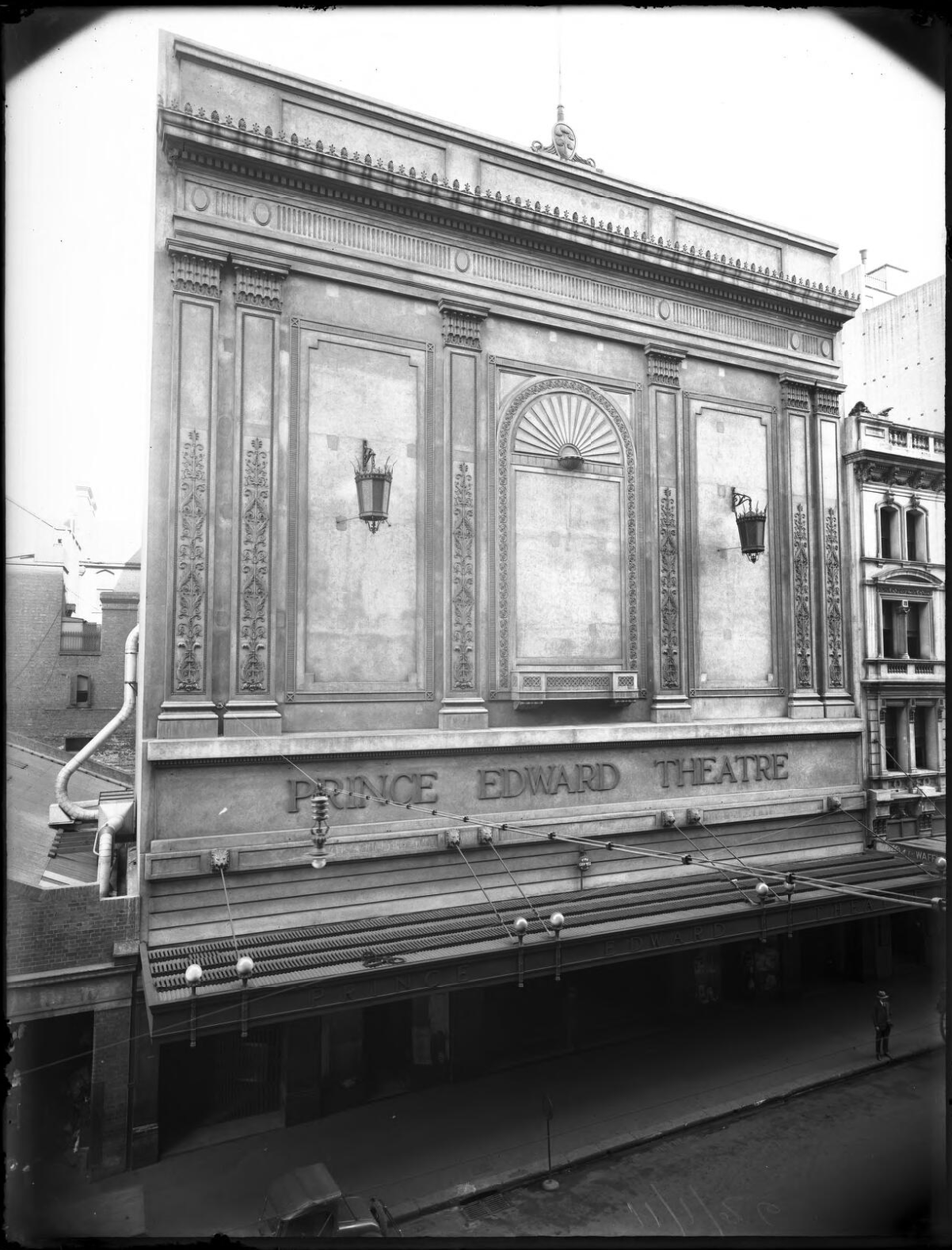
Prince Edward Theatre

Prince Edward Theatre was a picture theatre on Elizabeth and Castlereagh streets, Sydney, erected for the Carroll-Musgrove partnership of Harry G. Musgrove (died 27 April 1951) and brothers Edward and Dan Carroll) with financial backing from George Marlow in 1923. Architects were Robertson & Marks, with technical assistance from Thomas W. Lamb, the American picture theatre designer.

Described as Australia's "first cathedral of motion pictures", it opened on 22 November 1924. The first film shown was The Ten Commandments

In the era of silent film, the live sound accompanying a film was important to its success. The Prince Edward Concert Orchestra, of up to 21 players, was initially conducted by Will Prior (–1948), (Note: Prior had previously conducted the orchestra attached to Grauman's Metropolitan Theatre in Los Angeles) and followed 1927–1936 by Albert Cazabon, father of actor John Cazabon. The orchestra pit was raised or lowered by hydraulic lifts according to requirements. A Wurlitzer theatre organ, which could be used to either augment or replace the orchestra, was opened in February 1925 with Eddie Horton (born 1893) (Note: Horton previously played Wurlitzers at the Strand and California theatres, San Francisco) at the console.

The Prince Edward was regarded as unique in its elaborate sophistication until 1928, when the Regent, Capitol and State theatres opened or were refurbished in competition.

The theatre closed on 4 December 1965 and was subsequently demolished. The final film shown was a re-run of the 1956 classic, War and Peace.
