= The Lion Man (serial) =

1919 film

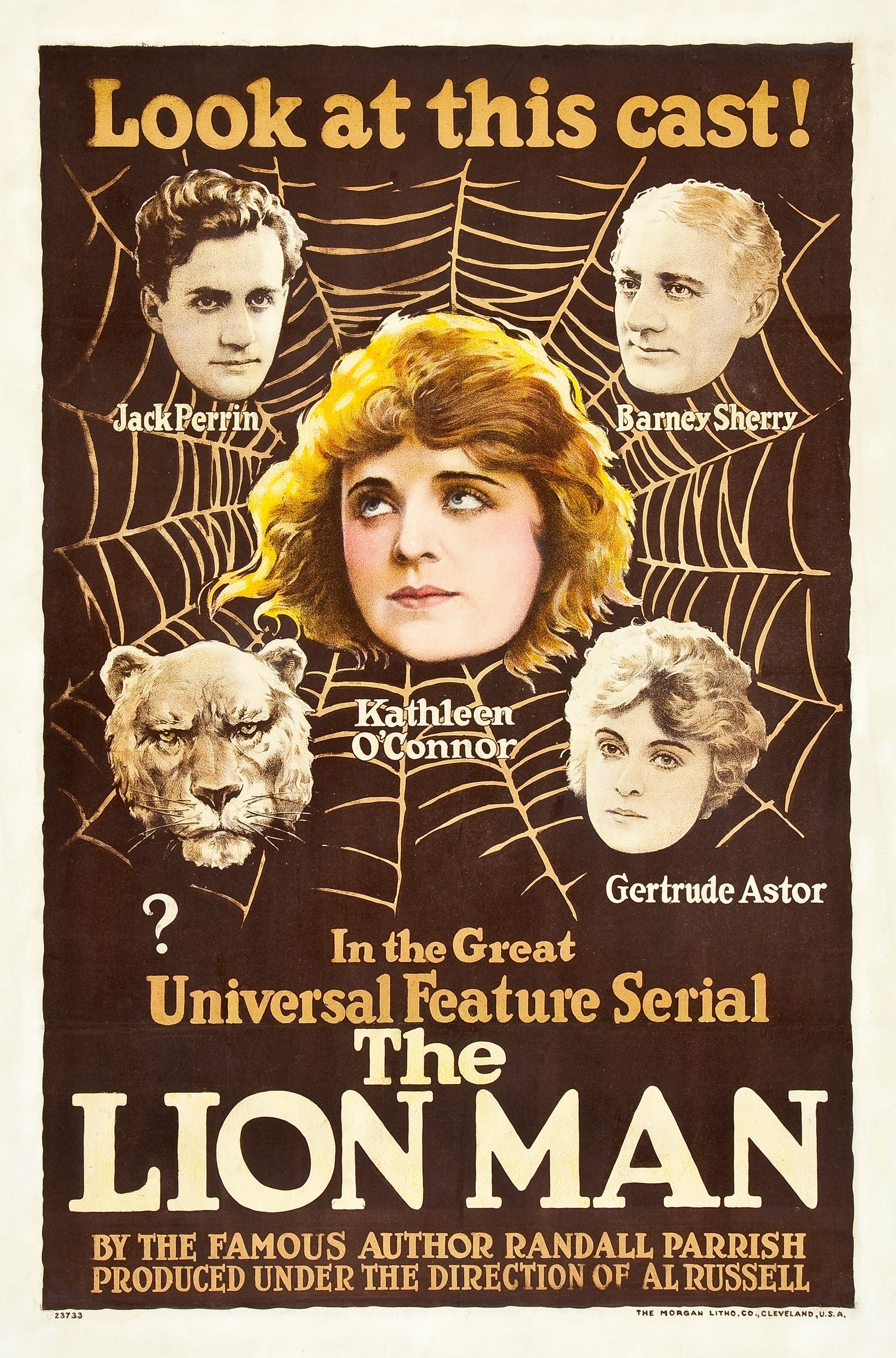
- Theatrical poster to The Lion Man
- Directed by: Albert Russell; Jack Wells
- Written by: Karl R. Coolidge; Russell Parrish
- Produced by: Albert Russell
- Starring: Kathleen O'Connor; Jack Perrin
- Distributed by: Universal Film Manufacturing Co.
- Release date: September 29, 1919
- Running time: 18 episodes
- Country: United States
- Language: Silent (English intertitles)

The Lion Man is a 1919 American action film serial released by the Universal Film Manufacturing Company, directed by Albert Russell and Jack Wells, produced by Russell and starring Kathleen O'Connor and Jack Perrin. The serial is now considered to be lost.

== Cast ==
- Kathleen O'Connor as Stella Donovan
- Jack Perrin as Jim Westcott
- Mack V. Wright as The Lion Man (in costume)
- J. Barney Sherry (credited Barney Sherry) as Frederick Cavendish / The Lion Man (unmasked)
- Gertrude Astor as Celeste La Rue
- Henry A. Barrows as Enright
- C. Norman Hammond as Ching
- Robert Walker as John Cavendish
- Tom London (credited as Leonard Clapham)
- Slim Padgett
- William A. Carroll

== Chapter titles ==
1. Flames of Hate
2. Rope of Death
3. Kidnappers
4. A Devilish Device
5. In the Lion's Den
6. House of Horrors
7. Doomed
8. Dungeon of Despair
9. Sold into Slavery
10. Perilous Plunge
11. At the Mercy of Monsters
12. Jaws of Destruction
13. When Hell Broke Loose
14. Desperate Deeds
15. Furnace of Fury
16. Relentless Renegades
17. In Cruel Clutches
18. In the Nick of Time

== See also ==
- List of film serials
- List of film serials by studio
