= The Mirror of Australia =

Former newspaper in Sydney, Australia 1915–1917

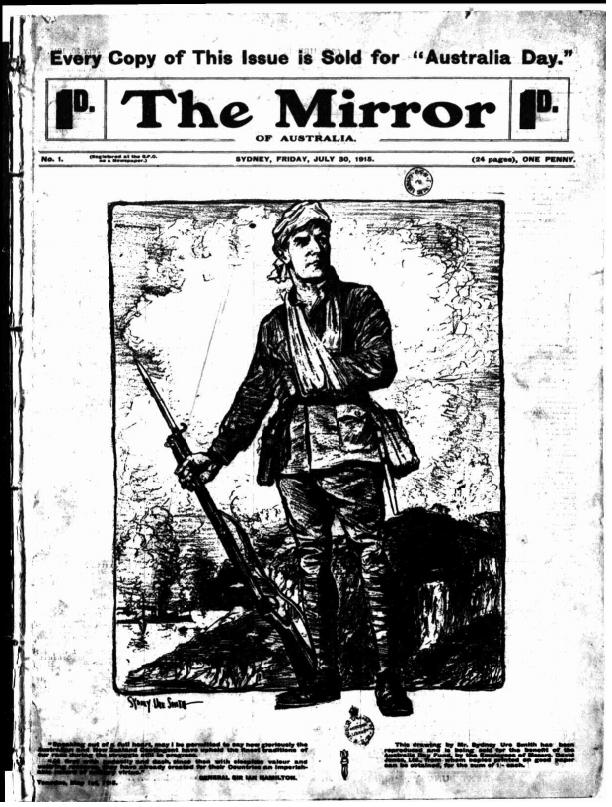
Front page of The Mirror of Australia, Friday 30 July 1915

The Mirror of Australia was an English-language newspaper published in Sydney, Australia from 1915 to 1917. It later merged with the Globe and Sunday Times War Pictorial and continued under the masthead of Mirror.

== History ==
The first issue of The Mirror of Australia appeared on 30 June 1915 and was modeled on the London Daily Mirror and London Daily Sketch papers. The last issue of The Mirror of Australia appeared on 19 May 1917. The paper was published during the First World War, and featured articles about Australian Imperial Forces and their engagement in the conflict.

The paper is listed in the Union list of local newspapers in New South Wales public libraries.

== Digitisation ==
The paper has been digitised as part of the Australian Newspapers Digitisation Program of the National Library of Australia.

== See also ==
- List of newspapers in Australia
- List of newspapers in New South Wales
