= Kathleen O'Connor (actress) =

American actress

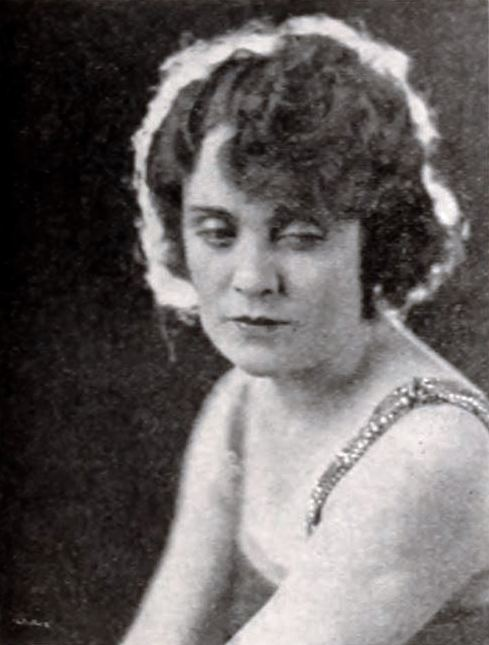
- Born: Kathleen Mavourneen O'Connor; July 7, 1894; Dayton, Ohio, US
- Died: June 24, 1957 (aged 62); Los Angeles, California, US
- Occupation: Actress
- Spouse: Lynn Reynolds (1921-1927, his death)

Kathleen O'Conner (sometimes credited as Kathleen Conners) (July 7, 1894 – June 24, 1957) was an American actress active in Hollywood during the silent era.

== Early life ==
O’Connor was born in Dayton, Ohio, to John O'Connor (a police officer) and Elizabeth Kinney. Her parents were both Irish immigrants. She graduated from high school and began working as a telephone operator in Toledo.

== Hollywood career ==
After touring with a local stock company, she convinced her parents to let her go to Hollywood around 1917 to seek her fortune in the movies. Early on, she secured work as an extra in Mack Sennett comedies, but she was soon discovered by Tom Mix and selected to be the cowboy's leading lady. She became known as a leading lady in 1920s Westerns.

== Death of Lynn Reynolds ==
She married prolific director Lynn Reynolds in 1921. Reynolds committed suicide in front of Kathleen and a handful of guests at a dinner party in 1927. Witnesses reported that Reynolds had beaten Kathleen before retrieving the gun.

== Later life ==
O'Connor withdrew from the film industry after Lynn Reynolds's death. She later married Clark Reynolds (no relation to Lynn). She died on June 24, 1957, at the age of 62 after a long illness.

== Selected filmography ==
- Dark Stairways (1924)
- Wild Bill Hickok (1923)
- The Old Homestead (1922)
- The Married Flapper (1922)
- Come On Over (1922)
- The Trouper (1922)
- Life's Darn Funny (1921)
- Sunset Jones (1921)
- Prairie Trails (1920)
- The Path She Chose (1920)
- Bullet Proof (1920)
- The Lion Man (1919)
- A Gun Fightin' Gentleman (1919)
- The Midnight Man (1919)
- Hell-Roarin' Reform (1919)
- Fame and Fortune (1918)
- Mr. Logan, U.S.A. (1918)
- Missing (1918)
- Ace High (1918)
