= The Jackeroo of Coolabong =

1920 film

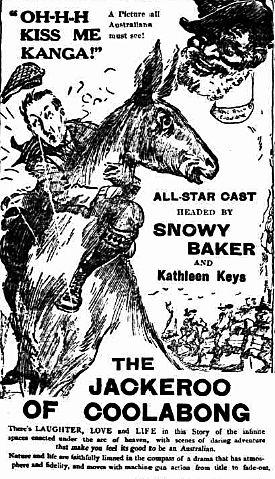
- Newspaper ad for film
- Directed by: Wilfred Lucas
- Written by: Bess Meredyth
- Produced by: E. J. Carroll; Snowy Baker
- Starring: Snowy Baker; Kathleen Key
- Cinematography: Al Burne
- Edited by: Dudley Blanchard
- Production company: Southern Cross Picture Productions
- Distributed by: Union Theatres (Australia); Aywon Corporation (USA)
- Release date: 16 October 1920
- Running time: 55 minutes
- Country: Australia
- Languages: Silent film; English intertitles

The Jackeroo of Coolabong is a 1920 Australian silent film starring renowned Australian sportsman Snowy Baker. It was the last of three films he made with the husband and wife team of director Wilfred Lucas and writer Bess Meredyth, both of whom had been imported from Hollywood.

It is considered a lost film.

== Synopsis ==
Brian O'Farrell (Snowy Baker), is an English 'new chum' who takes a job at an Australian cattle station. He is teased by station hands because of his appearance (including spats and a monocle) but he soon impresses them with his skills at riding and boxing. It is later revealed he is the owner of the station. He recalls his father's fights with Aboriginals in early days including the death dance and corroboree.

The station manager, John MacDonald (Wilfred Lucas), takes O'Farrell to Sydney to meet his daughter Edith (Kathleen Key) who is working in the slums. Edith is kidnapped by criminals after witnessing a crime but O'Farrell rescues her.

== Cast ==
- Snowy Baker as Brian O'Farrell
- Kathleen Key as Edith MacDonald
- Wilfred Lucas as John MacDonald
- Arthur Tauchert
- Bernice Vere
- Arthur Greenaway

== Production ==
Kathleen Key was imported from the US to play the female lead.

Lucas returned from the USA on 8 June 1920 with Key, Bert Glennon (a co director) and Dudley Blanchard (an editor). Australian actor Bernice Veree was put under a 12-month contract. "I already feel one of you," said Kathleen Key. "I am to act in Australian pictures, and I am sure that I shall be able to grasp the Australian ideal of womanhood, interpret it on the screen, and live up to it."

"I did not intend bringing to Australia a leading artist," said Lucas. "It is the policy of the Carroll firm to make and feature our own stars here. That policy shall be carried out, but Miss Key is such a 'find' that for the benefit of the industry in this country generally I though it necessary to secure her."

Shooting took place in June 1920 at Waverly with location work in the outback and on Sydney Harbour. During filming a kangaroo hunt in Narrabri, an extra, Nellie Park, fell off her horse and died of a fractured skull several days later.

Charles Chauvel worked on the film.

During filming E. J. Carroll clashed with Wilfred Lucas over the cost of films. Lucas soon returned to Hollywood with Bess Meredyth, taking Baker with them. Raymond Longford took over Carroll's Palmerston studio.

== Release ==
The film debuted on 16 October 1920 at Crystal Palace Cinema in Sydney.

== Critical reception ==
The Sydney Morning Herald said "The plot is a simple one, but their adventures are brimful of excitement and merriment. A special feature is the kangaroo hunt at Coolabong. The chase is well photographed, and the numerous 'roos fleeing before the dogs in mighty bounds form a spectacular scene of vivid animation."

Smith's Weekly declared " Direction, scenery, and acting good. Photography beautiful. But such a frail, artificial plot; The cast is lost in the fog of padding."

The Bulletin said the film "contains all the features that went to the making of The Lure of the Bush and Snowy Baker is once again demonstrator of how Young Australia can ride and dive and shoot and fight with his fists. Kathleen Key, the quaint little American importation, does not even contrive to look like an Australian girl."

== US release ==
The film was re-edited and released in the US by the Aywon Corp as The Fighting Breed.

Like all the Baker-Meredyth-Lucas collaborations, it was successful at the box office overseas, but returns did not come in quickly.

== See also ==
- List of lost films
