= The Leader (Orange, NSW) =

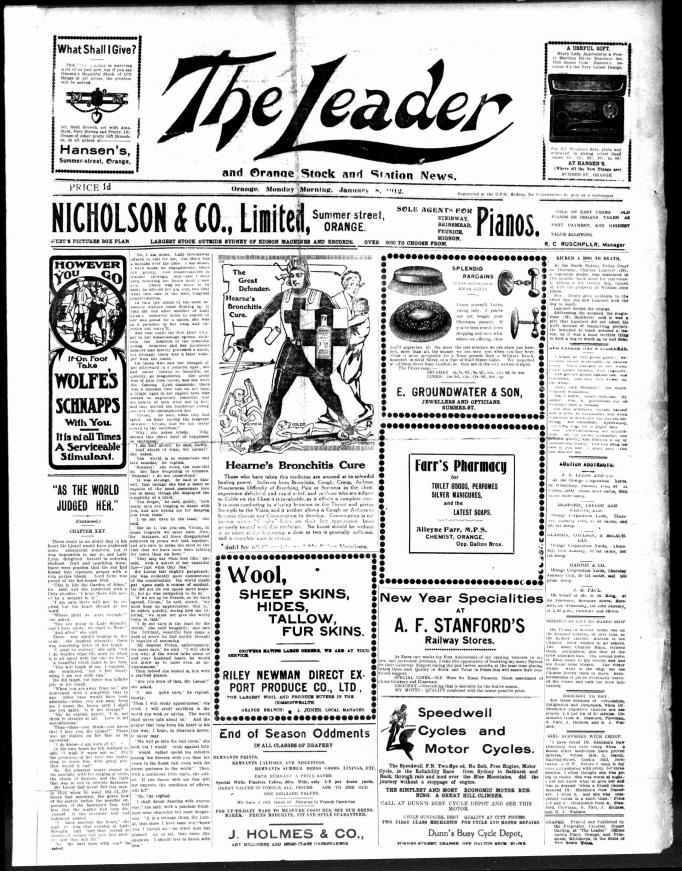
Front page of The Leader, 8 January 1912

The Leader was an English-language newspaper published in Orange, New South Wales from 1890 to 1945, a successor to the Orange Liberal. It began briefly as The Orange Leader, then The Orange Leader and Millthorpe Messenger before the masthead became The Leader for more than forty years.

== History ==
The Orange Liberal was started as a weekly newspaper about 4 May 1878, the title being changed to The Orange Leader on 4 October 1890. The paper was operated from premises on the southern side of the Forester's Hall in Lord's Place, the hall being the only building to separate The Orange Leader and its rival paper the Western Advocate. In 1894 the poet and author William Goodge became proprietor and editor, a role he held until c1899 when he left Orange, unable to pay the paper's debts. Goodge was succeeded by Ernest Shoebridge Carr.

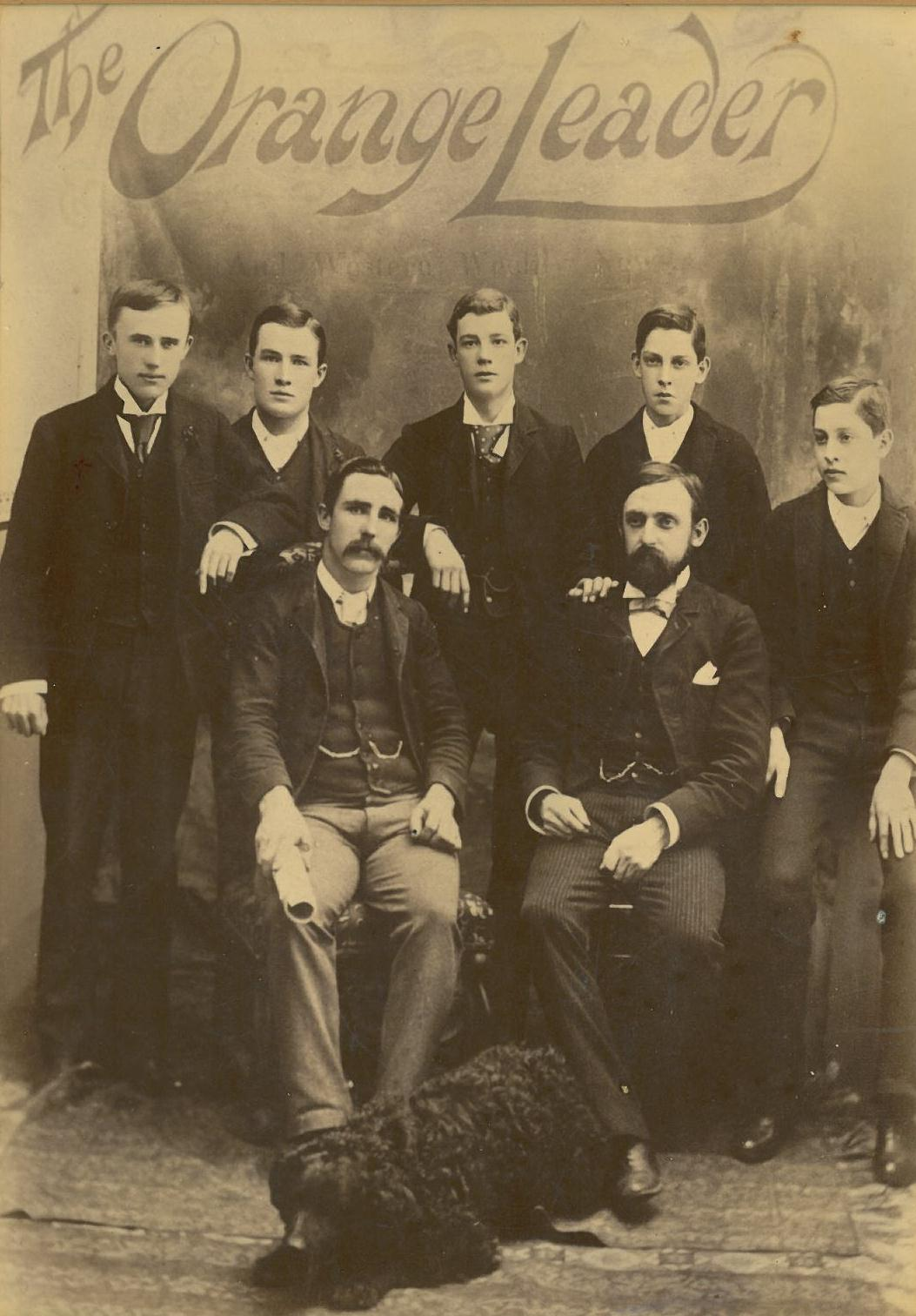
Staff portrait from The Orange Leader, c. 1900

On 3 January 1900 the paper changed its title to The Orange Leader and Millthorpe Messenger and on 29 January 1901, it incorporated the Sun which had begun publication in July 1898. On 30 July 1901 the frequency moved from bi-weekly to tri-weekly and at the same time the name was changed to The Leader. Two months later on 2 September 1901 The Leader became a daily.

When Carr was elected to Federal Parliament in 1906 he sold the business to Thomas Crouch from the Wellington Gazette to conduct it as a newspaper with a labor leaning. Shortly afterwards Crouch formed a partnership with Jack Porter, also of Wellington, and they traded as Porter and Crouch. The left-leaning paper was boycotted, especially by auctioneers who would not advertise in it and eventually the business was taken over by Crouch's mortgagor Mark Bembrick, also of Wellington.

Bembrick disposed of the business to Percival Stuart Garling, formerly of the Mudgee Western Post. He soon had The Leader on a firm footing and the paper was recognised as a first class advertising medium. When the worry of business became too great Bembrick recruited Gerry Flynn from Carcoar and Harry Leggo from Gilgandra to assist him. When Garling moved to Sydney he appointed Harry Leggo as manager and George Bell as foreman. A few years later the business was taken over by Flynn, Leggo and Bell. They controlled the business for some time after which time George Bell and then Gerry Flynn withdrew. The paper was held by the Leggo family until it was sold to Western Newspapers in 1945.

Before World War I The Leader and its rival the Western Advocate were daily publications. Because of a shortage of paper and manpower, it was decided that they should both become tri-weeklies from August 1915. Each paper's publication days were apparently decided on the toss of a coin; The Leader on Mondays, Wednesdays and Fridays and the Advocate on Tuesdays, Thursdays and Saturdays.

Such was local concern about the number of casualties in 1915 that The Leader started a fundraiser, ‘The Leader’s Acre’ calling on local farmers and orchardists to donate money received from one acre of their crops to support wounded soldiers on their return from the trenches. Locals were quick to respond.

On 1 July 1945 Western Newspapers Pty Ltd bought The Leader from the Leggo family and the Orange Advocate from George Thompson. On 1 October 1945 the first edition of the Central Western Daily was issued as a result of the merger between the two papers.

== Digitisation ==
Some issues of the paper have been digitised as part of the Australian Newspapers Digitisation Program of the National Library of Australia. The 10 millionth newspaper page made available through the service was the 31 July 1915 front page of The Leader.

== See also ==
- List of newspapers in Australia
- List of newspapers in New South Wales
