= The Shadow of Lightning Ridge =

1921 film

- Theatrical release poster
- Directed by: Wilfred Lucas
- Written by: Bess Meredyth
- Produced by: E.J. Carroll; Snowy Baker
- Starring: Snowy Baker; Agnes Vernon
- Cinematography: Robert Doerrer
- Production company: Carroll-Baker Australian Productions
- Distributed by: Aywon Pictures (US)
- Release dates: 3 April 1920 (Australia); 13 September 1921 (US)
- Running time: 7 reels
- Country: Australia
- Languages: Silent film; English intertitles

The Shadow of Lightning Ridge is a 1920 Australian silent film starring renowned Australian sportsman Snowy Baker. It has been called the most "Western"-like of the films Baker made in Australia.

It is now considered a lost film.

Charles Chauvel had a small role as a groom.

The success of the film prompted the formation of the Carroll-Baker Film Corporation with capital of £25,000. A studio, Palmerston, at Waverly was established.

== Synopsis ==
Travelling in a carriage is Sir Edward Marriott, a wealthy mine owner, his fiancée Dorothy Hardyn, and a bag containing the month's pay for the miners. They are travelling to Marriott's estate at Lightning Ridge. There is also a man with a hacking cough.

A conveyance with armed escort meets the train to prevent the large sum of money from a mysterious outlaw known as The Shadow. However The Shadow, the man with the hacking cough, gets the money and a necklace from the Dorothy. He jumps on to a horse and escapes.

It turns out the Shadow is actually a gentleman in disguise with a vendetta against Sir Edward because his mother has been victimised by him. He has become a The Shadow but only attacks Sir Edward's property.

The Shadow rescues Dorothy from real bushrangers and they fall in love. Later he discovers he is the real heir to Sir Edward's property. Portuguese Anne, who is in love with the Shadow, becomes jealous of Dorothy and arranges for the Shadow to be arrested. However he escapes.

== Cast ==
- Snowy Baker as the Shadow
- Agnes Vernon as Dorothy Harden
- Bernice Vere as Portuguese Annie
- Wilfred Lucas as Sir Edward Marriott
- Evelyn Johnson
- Reg K Bisley as station guard

== Production ==
The script was clearly inspired by Zorro, which Bess Meredyth later adapted in The Mark of Zorro (1940). After reading the script and seeing the stunts he was required to perform, Baker reportedly went out and insured himself for £5,000.

Lucas said he wanted to give Baker a different acting challenge to The Man from Kangaroo.

Bernice Vere was a discovery of Baker's. She was signed to a 12-month contract.

Shooting took place in early 1920 in the bush near Sydney, at Bulli Pass and Loddon Falls and at a studio built by E.J. Carroll at Palmerston near Waverly.

A highlight of the film was Snowy Baker on horseback jumping 40 metres off a cliff.

Baker used a stuntman for some of the more dangerous scenes.

== Reception ==
=== Critical ===
The trade paper Everyone's said:

Baker as an elusive bushranger brings joy to the hearts of the Pussyfoots by entirely wrecking a bush pub. Snowy doesn’t do it on behalf of prohibition. He’s escaping from the Law and the big fight that ensues causes the damage. It was thought at first that the big scene could be done with empty bottles on the shelves, but so many were smashed that it was found that there was a sad lack of realism. So, to the horror of many actors, dozens of bottles of real whisky were deliberately wasted. Now, it is said, " The Shadow of Lightning Ridge" is certain of a tremendous success especially after 6 p.m. Thirsty folk will go along just to smell the bush pubs scene.

The Bulletin praised the photography but thought the story was too American saying the "only Australian thing about" the movie "is the setting. The scenery is dinkum, but the story itself is a mixture of old melodrama and Wild West movie. Australia wants Australian films, and in spite of "Snowy" Baker's great athletic business, she will refuse to swallow "The Shadow" as the thing her soul cries for. Leading-woman Brownie Vernon, also being American, adds nothing Australian to the picture. But the photography is excellent." Another article in the same magazine said the film "claims Australian patronage on account of its local production, but is in all its gun play and other effects imitation American. Heaven forbid that this sort of stuff should go out to the world as dinkum Australian !"

The Lone Hand said it was the "Best Australian production to date. Station life and bush scenes well depicted, but story not original."

Australian Worker said the film was "considerably better" than Man from Kangaroo.

Meredyth and Lucas left for Sonoma on 11 February 1920 so were not in Australia when the film premiered.

=== Box office ===
The film was a success at the Australian box office. Reportedly "thousands" witnessed it in its Melbourne season and broke box office records in Newcastle.

Dan Carroll later said his company "was encouraged to consider making further pictures" after the success of this and Man from Kangaroo. He "found, however, that small producers had entered the field, and, releasing pictures of a low duality, had made Australian films subjects for the ridicule of audiences. Lack of Australian stories suitable for dramatisation and the fact that oversea producers were releasing films more than sufficient for market needs had also forced him and his associates to abandon the production of films."

The film was screened in Australian cinemas as late as 1923.

=== US release ===
The film was released in the US in 1922 by William Selig. One trade paper wrote that:

"Good stunt stuff is introduced in the film, and there are a few genuine thrills such as the leap from a dashing horse on to a speeding train; a kidnapping episode and a daring rescue. In connection with some of the stunts performed by Baker it would seem that either the director has been too hasty in an effort to get action or the film has not been carefully cut. At any rate, things happen along just a little too quickly to follow comprehensively. This is particularly noticeable in the instance where Baker rescues the girl he loves."

== See also ==
- List of lost films
