= Bess Meredyth =

American film actress and screenwriter (1890–1969)

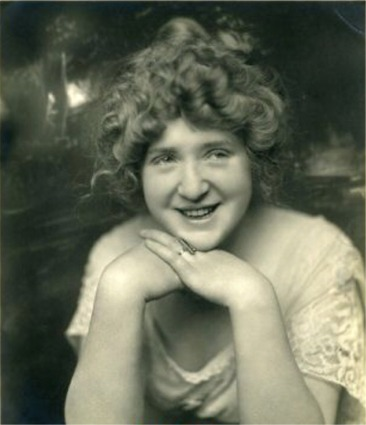
- Meredyth in c. 1915
- Born: Helen Elizabeth MacGlashan; February 12, 1890
- Died: July 13, 1969 (aged 79); Los Angeles, California, U.S.
- Occupations: Actress, screenwriter
- Years active: 1912–1947
- Spouses: Burton Leslie (m. 1912; annul. 1912) Wilfred Lucas (m. 1917; div. 1927) Michael Curtiz (m. 1929; died 1962)
- Children: John Meredyth Lucas

Bess Meredyth (born Helen Elizabeth MacGlashan, February 12, 1890 – July 13, 1969) was a screenwriter and silent film actress. The wife of film director Michael Curtiz, Meredyth wrote The Affairs of Cellini (1934) and adapted The Unsuspected (1947). She was one of the 36 founders of the Academy of Motion Picture Arts and Sciences.

== Early life ==
Meredyth began her involvement in performing and writing from an early age. Her father was the manager at a local theatre, and she studied piano throughout her childhood. After encouragement from her English teacher, Meredyth also pursued fiction writing. At the age of 13, she approached the local newspaper editor about writing a fiction column. Each story she wrote for the paper earned her a dollar, making this her first paid work as a writer.

Meredyth began her career in show business in vaudeville as a comedian. She most often sang or performed monologues while accompanying herself on the piano, a form she referred to as a "pianologue."

== Acting career ==
Meredyth began her screen career as an extra at D.W. Griffith's Biograph Studios in New York, before moving to Los Angeles in 1911. Meredyth worked as an actress for five years, subsidizing her income with screenwriting. While most of this work was as an extra, her most prominent role was the titular character in the 4-reel Bess the Detectress (1914) serials.

== Relationship With Wilfred Lucas ==
Meredyth met Wilfred Lucas in 1911 when he encouraged her to pursue screen acting. The year after, the two worked together on the film A Sailor's Heart (1913), the first of many artistic collaborations. They were eventually given their production unit at Universal Studios, in which they produced the 30-reel long Trey of Hearts (1914) serials.

Meredyth and Lucas had one child together, television writer John Meredyth Lucas. They divorced in 1927, following her return from supervising Ben Hur (1925)

== Work with Snowy Baker ==
In 1918, Meredyth and Lucas traveled to Australia to work with Australian sportsman Snowy Baker. They made three films together, The Man from Kangaroo (1920), The Jackeroo of Coolabong (1920) and The Shadow of Lightning Ridge (1921), the first two of which Meredyth co-directed. She was arguably the first professional screenwriter to work in Australia.

== Relationship with Michael Curtiz ==
Meredyth and director Michael Curtiz met soon after his arrival in the United States, while both were working at Warner Brothers Studios. They were married in 1929 and unsuccessfully attempted to start a production unit at MGM studios in 1946.

Though often uncredited, Meredyth contributed to several of Curtiz's projects. Most notably, Curtiz reportedly called Meredyth for input several times a day while working on his most successful film, Casablanca (1942).

Meredyth and Curtiz separated twice; once in 1941, and again in 1960. However, they remained in contact after this separation, and Curtiz included Meredyth in his will upon his death in 1962.

== Book ==
In 1934, Covei-Friede published The Mighty Barnum by Meredyth and Gene Fowler. In a review in The New York Times, John Chamberlain wrote that the book "marks the first time that a motion-picture scenario, or 'shooting script,' has been published in book form."

== Retirement ==
Throughout her time at MGM studios, Meredyth had mainly worked under Irving Thalberg. Upon his death in 1936, the new MGM executives dropped Meredyth's contract. Rather than re-entering as a "junior writer," as the new executives offered, Meredyth decided to retire from professional screenwriting. Despite this announcement, she has three credits after her alleged retirement, The Mark of Zorro (1940), That Night in Rio (1941), and The Unsuspected (1947).

== Death ==
On July 13, 1969, Meredyth died at the Motion Picture Country Hospital at age 79.

== Filmography ==
=== As writer ===
- The Modern Prodigal (1910)
- A Sailor's Heart (1912)
- Cross Purposes (1913)
- The Gratitude of Wanda (1913)
- The Mystery of Yellow Aster Mine (1913)
- The Forbidden Room (1914)
- The Trey o' Hearts (1914)
- When Lizzie Got Her Polish (1914)
- The Last Trump (1914)
- The First Law (1914)
- When Bess Got in Wrong (1914)
- The Jaws of Death (1914)
- The Mirage (1914)
- The Painted Hills (1914)
- Steel Ribbons (1914)
- As the Crow Flies (1914)
- The Mock Rose (1914)
- Stalemate (1914)
- The Crack o' Doom (1914)
- The Sunset Tide (1914)
- Dead Reckoning (1914)
- The Sea Venture (1914)
- Her Twin Brother (1914)
- White Water (1914)
- Flower of the Flames (1914)
- The Love Victorious (1914)
- The Severed Hand (1914)
- Passing the Love of Woman (1914)
- The Mystery of Wickham Hall (1914)
- Women and Roses (1914)
- Cupid Incognito (1914)
- The Way of a Woman (1914)
- The Voice of the Viola (1914)
- The Countess Betty's Mine (1914)
- The Fascination of the Fleur de Lis (1915)
- Stronger Than Death (1915)
- The Ghost Wagon (1915)
- In His Mind's Eye (1915)
- The Fear Within (1915)
- Putting One Over (1915)
- The Human Menace (1915)
- The Mother Instinct (1915)
- The Blood of the Children (1915)
- Their Hour (1915)
- Wheels Within Wheels (1915)
- The Mystery Woman (1915)
- A Woman's Debt (1915)
- The Wedding Guest (1916)
- Pretty Baby (1916)
- It Sounded Like a Kiss (1916)
- Pass the Prunes (1916)
- The White Turkey (1916)
- A Price on His Head (1916)
- Fame at Last (1916)
- The Decoy (1916)
- Breaking Into Society (1916)
- Borrowed Plumes (1916)
- A Hero by Proxy (1916)
- He Almost Lands an Angel (1916)
- Hired and Fired (1916)
- The Small Magnetic Hand (1916)
- From the Rogue's Gallery (1916)
- He Becomes a Cop (1916)
- The Heart of a Show Girl (1916)
- A Thousand Dollars a Week (1916)
- The Sody Clerk (1916)
- Cross Purposes (1916)
- Number 16 Martin Place (1916)
- The Twin Triangle (1916)
- Spellbound (1916)
- Mismates (1916)
- Pay Me! (1917)
- Scandal (1917)
- A Five Foot Ruler (1917)
- A Wife's Suspicion (1917)
- The Midnight Man (1917)
- Three Women of France (1917)
- The Little Orphan (1917)
- Bringing Home Father (1917)
- The Light of Love (1917)
- The Townsend Divorce Case (1917)
- The Girl Who Lost (1917)
- A Million in Sight (1917)
- His Wife's Relatives (1917)
- Why, Uncle! (1917)
- A Macaroni Sleuth (1917)
- Treat 'Em Rough (1917)
- One Thousand Miles an Hour (1917)
- Practice What You Preach (1917)
- That Devil, Bateese (1918)
- The Man Who Wouldn't Tell (1918)
- The Romance of Tarzan (1918)
- Pretty Babies (1918)
- The Red, Red Heart (1918)
- The Grain of Dust (1918)
- Morgan's Raiders (1918)
- The Girl from Nowhere (1919)
- Big Little Person (1919)
- The Man from Kangaroo (1920)
- The Jackeroo of Coolabong (1920)
- The Grim Comedian (1921)
- The Shadow of Lightning Ridge (1921)
- The Fighting Breed (1921)
- The Woman He Married (1922)
- The Song of Life (1922)
- One Clear Call (1922)
- Rose o' the Sea (1922)
- Grand Larceny (1922)
- The Dangerous Age (1923)
- Strangers of the Night (1923)
- Thy Name Is Woman (1924)
- The Red Lily (1924)
- A Slave of Fashion (1925)
- The Love Hour (1925)
- Ben-Hur: A Tale of the Christ (1925)
- The Wife Who Wasn't Wanted (1925)
- Don Juan (1926)
- The Sea Beast (1926)
- The Magic Flame (1927)
- Rose of the Golden West (1927)
- Irish Hearts (1927)
- When a Man Loves (1927)
- Yellow Lily (1928)
- The Scarlet Lady (1928)
- A Woman of Affairs (1928) – nominated for Academy Award
- The Mysterious Lady (1928)
- The Little Shepherd of Kingdom Come (1928)
- Sailors' Wives (1928)
- Wonder of Women (1929) – nominated for Academy Award
- The Sea Bat (1930)
- Our Blushing Brides (1930)
- Romance (1930)
- In Gay Madrid (1930)
- Chasing Rainbows (1930)
- Laughing Sinners (1931)
- West of Broadway (1931)
- The Cuban Love Song (1931)
- The Phantom of Paris (1931)
- The Prodigal (1931)
- Strange Interlude (1932)
- Red-Headed Woman (1932)
- Polly of the Circus (1932)
- Looking Forward (1933)
- The Affairs of Cellini (1934)
- The Mighty Barnum (1934)
- The Iron Duke (1934)
- Metropolitan (1935)
- Folies Bergère de Paris (1935)
- Charlie Chan at the Opera (1936)
- Half Angel (1936)
- Under Two Flags (1936)
- The Great Hospital Mystery (1937)
- Drums Along the Mohawk (1939)
- Susannah of the Mounties (1939)
- The Mark of Zorro (1940)
- That Night in Rio (1941)
- The Unsuspected (1947)

=== As actress ===
- The Spanish Jade (1915)
- The Mother Instinct (1915) as Madame de Voux
- When Eddie Took a Bath (1915) as Bess, the Wife
- Who Stole the Bridegroom? (1914) as Bess, the Bride
- When Lizzie Got Her Polish (1914) as Bess
- When Their Brides Got Mixed (1914) as Bess, the Bride
- When the Girls Were Shanghaied (1914) as Mrs. Newlywed
- Those Were the Happy Days (1914) as The Belle of the School
- When Bess Got in Wrong (1914) as Bess
- Father's Bride (1914) as The Wife
- The Little Auto-Go-Mobile (1914) as The Wife
- Pass Key Number Two (1914) as Wifie
- Her Twin Brother (1914) as Josephine Brown
- The Third Party (1914) as Bess, the Wife
- The Wooing of Bessie Bumpkin (1914) as Bessie Bumpkin
- Jimmy Kelly and the Kidnappers (1914) as Bess
- Willy Walrus and the Awful Confession (1914) as Bessie Bumpkin
- Bess the Detectress in the Dog Watch (1914) as Bess
- Bess the Detectress in Tick, Tick, Tick (1914) as Bess the Detectress
- Willy Walrus, Detective (1914) as Bessie Bumpkin
- The Cure (1914) as The Daughter
- Bess the Detectress in the Old Mill at Midnight (1914) as Bess
- Willy Walrus and the Baby (1914) as Bessie Bumpkin
- The Call Back (1914)
- The Fascinating Eye (1914) as Bess
- Stolen Glory (1914) as Jane Dare
- Dangers of the Veldt (1914) as Gretchen
- The Desert's Sting (1914) as Helen Edwards
- Bred in the Bone (1914) as The Colonel's Daughter
- A House Divided (1913) as Betty Culver
- The Widow and the Widower (1913) as One of the Children
- Gold Is Not All (1913) as The Slavey
- A Sailor's Heart (1913) as The Sailor's 1st Sweetheart
