= E. J. Carroll =

Australian theatre and film producer (1874–1931)

Edward John Carroll (28 June 1874 – 28 July 1931), better known as E. J. Carroll, was an Australian theatre and film businessman. He produced several films starring Snowy Baker and Raymond Longford, and helped establish Birch, Carroll and Coyle. Difficulties in securing international distribution for his films turned him away from production towards exhibition.

Carroll was a partner, along with his brother Daniel Joseph "Dan" Carroll (1886–1959) and Harry G. Musgrove (died 1951), in the Carroll-Musgrove partnership which, with financial assistance from George Marlow, founded the magnificent Prince Edward Theatre on Castlereagh Street, Sydney.

== Filmography ==
- For the Term of His Natural Life (1908) - producer
- The Sentimental Bloke (1919) - distributor
- On Our Selection (1920) - producer
- The Man from Kangaroo (1920) - producer
- The Jackeroo of Coolabong (1920) - producer
- Ginger Mick (1920) - producer
- The Shadow of Lightning Ridge (1921) - producer
- The Blue Mountains Mystery (1921) - producer
