= List of Australian films of the 1910s =

This is a list of Australian films of the 1910s. For a complete alphabetical list, see Category:Australian films.

== 1910s ==
Title	Director	Cast	Genre	Notes
1910
Marvellous Melbourne: Queen City of the South	Cosens Spencer		Documentary	IMDb
Moonlite	John Gavin	John Gavin, H. A. Forsyth, Ruby Butler	Short	31 December IMDb
The Squatter's Daughter	Bert Bailey	Olive Wilton, Bert Bailey, Edmund Duggan		4 August – Based on play IMDb
Thunderbolt	John Gavin	John Gavin, Ruby Butler, H. A. Forsyth	Short	12 November IMDb
1911
All for Gold, or Jumping the Claim	Franklyn Barrett	Walter Bastin, Herbert Bentley, Ronald McLeod	Short	IMDb
The Assigned Servant	John Gavin	Agnes Gavin, John Gavin, Sid Harrison, Dore Kurtz	Short	IMDb
Assigned to his Wife	John Gavin	John Gavin, Agnes Gavin, Carr Austin	Drama	9 October IMDb
Attack on the Gold Escort	?		Action drama	26 June IMDb
The Bells	W. J. Lincoln	Nellie Bramley, Miss Grist		7 October IMDb
Ben Hall and his Gang	John Gavin	John Gavin	Short	IMDb
Bushranger's Ransom, or A Ride for Life	E. I. Cole	E. I. Cole's Bohemian Dramatic Company		28 March IMDb
Called Back	W. J. Lincoln	Arthur Styan	Short	15 April IMDb
Caloola, or The Adventures of a Jackeroo	Alfred Rolfe	Charles Villiers		20 November IMDb
Captain Midnight, the Bush King	Alfred Rolfe	Alfred Rolfe, Lily Dampier, Raymond Longford	Drama	9 February IMDb
Captain Starlight, or Gentleman of the Road	Alfred Rolfe	Lily Dampier, Lottie Lyell, Augustus Neville, Alfred Rolfe, Raymond Longford		16 March – Based on novel IMDb
The Christian	Franklyn Barrett	Roy Redgrave, Eugenie Duggan	Drama	2 December – Based on play IMDb
The Colleen Bawn	Gaston Mervale	Louise Lovely, James Martin		25 September IMDb
The Cup Winner	Alfred Rolfe	Charles Villiers	Drama	7 November IMDb
Dan Morgan	Cosens Spencer	?	Drama	22 May IMDb
The Double Event	W. J. Lincoln	Martyn Hagan, The Bland Holt Company		21 October IMDb
The Drover's Sweetheart	John Gavin	John Gavin	Drama / Thriller	9 May IMDb
The Fatal Wedding	Raymond Longford	Master Anson, Miss Clare, Tom Cosgrove, George D. Ellis		24 April IMDb
The Five of Hearts	E. I. Cole	E. I. Cole, E. I. Cole's Bohemian Dramatic Company		10 May IMDb
Frank Gardiner, the King of the Road	John Gavin	John Gavin		27 February IMDb
The Golden West	George Young			27 March IMDb
In the Nick of Time	Alfred Rolfe	Drama		4 September IMDb
It Is Never Too Late to Mend	W. J. Lincoln	Stanley Walpole	Drama	7 January (produced by J. and N. Tait) IMDb
The Lady Outlaw	Alfred Rolfe	Charles Villiers	Drama	28 August IMDb
The Life of Rufus Dawes	Alfred Rolfe	Lily Dampier, Raymond Longford, Lottie Lyell		19 June – Based on novel IMDb
The Lost Chord	W. J. Lincoln	?	Drama	13 May IMDb
The Luck of Roaring Camp	W. J. Lincoln	John Cosgrove	Western	25 March IMDb
Mates of the Murrumbidgee	Alfred Rolfe	?	Drama	4 September IMDb
The Miner's Curse	Alfred Rolfe	?		7 December IMDb
The Miner's Daughter	Leo Forbert	Bert McCarthy	Drama	28 June IMDb
A Miner's Luck	?	?	Drama	1911
Moora Neya, or The Message of the Spear	Alfred Rolfe	Ethel Phillips, Charles Villiers, Stanley Walpole		31 July IMDb
The Mystery of a Hansom Cab	W. J. Lincoln			4 March – Based on novel IMDb
One Hundred Years Ago	Gaston Mervale	Louise Lovely, Harrie Ireland, A. J. Patrick, Godfrey Cass	Drama / Thriller	8 May IMDb
Only a Factory Girl	?	?	Drama	14 August IMDb
The Romantic Story of Margaret Catchpole	Raymond Longford	William Coulter, J. Eldridge, Jack Goodall, Fred Hardy		7 August IMDb
Sentenced for Life	E. I. Cole	E. I. Cole's Bohemian Dramatic Company		10 June IMDb
The Squatter and the Clown	?	?	Drama	16 August IMDb
The Squatter's Son	E. I. Cole	E. I. Cole's Bohemian Dramatic Company		22 April IMDb
The Sundowner	E. I. Cole	Vera Remée, Frank Mills		21 August IMDb
Sweet Nell of Old Drury	Raymond Longford	Walter Bastin, Dorothy Clarke, Stewart Clyde, W. Edgeworth		2 December IMDb
A Tale of the Australian Bush (a.k.a. Ben Hall, the Notorious Bushranger)	Gaston Mervale	A. J. Patrick, Godfrey Cass, Harry Beaumont		3 October IMDb
Three Strings to Her Bow	George Young	?	Comedy	10 April IMDb
A Ticket in Tatts	Gaston Mervale	A. J. Patrick, Alf Scarlett	Comedy	19 June IMDb
Way Outback	Alfred Rolfe	Charles Villiers	Romance	25 September IMDb
What Women Suffer	Alfred Rolfe	Alfred Rolfe, Ethel Phillips, Stanley Walpole, Charles Villiers	Drama / Thriller	2 October IMDb
1912
Angel of his Dreams	George Marlow	Ada Guilford, J. Stanford, H. Twitcham	Drama	IMDb
Breaking the News	W. J. Lincoln	Harrie Ireland, Arthur Styan	Drama	
The Bushman's Bride				
Call of the Bush	Charles Woods		Drama	
The Cheat	Alfred Rolfe	Charles Villiers		
Conn, the Shaughraun	Gaston Mervale	Louise Lovely	Drama	
Cooee and the Echo	Alfred Rolfe	Charles Villiers	Drama	
Crime and the Criminal				
A Daughter of Australia				
Do Men Love Women?				
The Eleventh Hour				
Gambler's Gold				
Hands Across the Sea				
King of the Coiners				
The Life Story of John Lee, or The Man They Could Not Hang				
The Love Tyrant				
The Midnight Wedding				
The Moira, or Mystery of the Bush				
The Mystery of the Black Pearl				
The Octoroon				
Percy Gets a Job				
Rip Van Winkle				
A Silent Witness				
The Sin of a Woman				
The Strangler's Grip				
Strike				
The Ticket of Leave Man				
The Tide of Death				
Whose Was the Hand?	Alfred Rolfe	Charles Villiers, Stanley Walpole	Short/Drama/Thriller	IMDb
Won on the Post				
The Wreck of the Dunbar or The Yeoman's Wedding				
1913
Australia Calls	Raymond Longford	William E. Hart, Lottie Lyell, Alfred O'Shea, Frank Philips, Andrew Warr, George Wilkins		IMDb
A Blue Gum Romance	Franklyn Barrett	Tien Hogue, Douglas Lotherington, Tom Middleton	Drama / Thriller	IMDb
The Bondage of the Bush	Charles Woods	Alfred Bristow, Wilton Power, D. R. Rivenall, Charles Woods	Short/ Drama /Thriller	IMDb
The Crisis				
Dr. Mawson in the Antarctic				
The Life of a Jackeroo				
A Melbourne Mystery				
Moondyne	W.J Lincoln	George Bryant, Roy Redgrave, Godfrey Cass	Drama	1 September 1913 IMDb
'Neath Austral Skies				
Pommy Arrives in Australia				
The Remittance Man				
The Reprieve				
The Road to Ruin				
Sea Dogs of Australia				
The Sick Stockrider				
Transported	W. J. Lincoln	George Bryant, Godfrey Cass, Roy Redgrave		
1914
The Day	Alfred Rolfe			
A Long, Long Way to Tipperary	George Dean			
The Silence of Dean Maitland	Raymond Longford	Harry Thomas, Arthur Shirley		
The Swagman's Story	Raymond Longford	Lottie Lyell		
Taking His Chance	Raymond Longford	Lottie Lyell		
Trooper Campbell	Raymond Longford	Lottie Lyell		
1915
For Australia				
The Hero of the Dardanelles	Alfred Rolfe	Guy Hastings, Loma Rossmore	Short	20 per cent of the film survives.
How We Beat the Emden				
Into Australia's Unknown				
The Loyal Rebel				
Ma Hogan's New Boarder				
My Partner				
The Rebel				
The Shepherd of the Southern Cross				
The Sunny South or The Whirlwind of Fate				
We'll Take Her Children in Amongst Our Own				IMDb
Within Our Gates				
1916
Charlie at the Sydney Show				
Get-Rich-Quick Wallingford	Fred Niblo	Fred Niblo, Enid Bennett	Comedy	
If the Huns Came to Melbourne				
In the Last Stride				
An Interrupted Divorce				
The Joan of Arc of Loos				
The Life of Adam Lindsay Gordon				
A Maori Maid's Love				
The Martyrdom of Nurse Cavell	Jack Gavin, Charles Post Mason	Jack Gavin		Rel. 31 January 1916 IMDb
Murphy of Anzac				
Nurse Cavell				
Officer 666	Fred Niblo	Fred Niblo, Enid Bennett	Comedy	
The Pioneers				
La Revanche				
Seven Keys to Baldpate				
Within the Law				
The Woman in the Case				
1917
Australia's Peril	Franklyn Barrett	Maie Baird, Roland Conway, John De Lacey, P. G. Sadler, Olga Willard-Turton (credited as Olga Willard), Rock Phillips, Charles Villiers, Lily Rochefort, Maud Styan, Claude Turton, Charles Beetham	War	19 May, believed to be a lost film IMDb
The Church and the Woman	Raymond Longford	George K. Chesterton Bonar, Nada Conrade, Boyd Irwin	Drama	13 October IMDb
The Hayseeds Come to Sydney (a.k.a. The Hayseeds Come to Town)	Beaumont Smith	Tal Ordell, Fred MacDonald, Harry McDonna		9 July IMDb
The Hayseeds' Backblocks Show				
The Monk and the Woman				
The Murder of Captain Fryatt	John Gavin	Harrington Reynolds, John Gavin, Olive Proctor	Short	26 February IMDb
Our Friends the Hayseeds (a.k.a. The Hayseeds)	Beaumont Smith	Roy Redgrave, Walter Cornock, Pearl Hellmrich, Margaret Gordon, J. Plumpton Wilson, H. H. Wallace, Vera Spaull, Cecil Haines, Jack Radford, Peter Ward, Tom Cannam, Percy Mackay, Nan Taylor, Crosbie Ward, Fred Carlton, Olga Agnew, Gerald Kay Souper, Esther Mitchell		19 March IMDb
Remorse, a Story of the Red Plague	J. E. Mathews	Cyril Mackay, Ida Gresham, Marie D'Alton	Drama	3 January IMDb
1918
500 Pounds Reward				
Algie's Romance	Leonard Doogood	Leonard Doogood	Comedy	IMDb
A Coo-ee from Home				
Cupid Camouflaged				
The Enemy Within		Snowy Baker		
The Hayseeds' Melbourne Cup	Beaumont Smith			
His Convict Bride				
His Only Chance				
Just Peggy				
The Laugh on Dad				
The Lure of the Bush		Snowy Baker		
A Romance of Burke and Wills Expedition of 1860				
Satan in Sydney	Beaumont Smith			
Scars of Love				
The Waybacks	Arthur W. Sterry	Vincent White, Gladys Leigh, Lucy Adair, Louis Machilaton, Rose Rooney, Harry Hodson, William Turner, George Hewlitt, Lance Vance		IMDb
What Happened to Jean	Herbert Walsh	James Anderson, Edith Crowe, Mrs. Ernest Good, Herbert Walsh, Price Weir	Drama / Thriller	IMDb
The Woman Suffers	Raymond Longford	Lottie Lyell, Boyd Irwin	Drama	IMDb
Yachts and Hearts, or The Opium Smugglers	Charles Byers Coates		Drama	IMDb
1919
Australia's Own	J. E. Ward	Garry Gordon, Nellie Romer	Action / Adventure	20 January IMDb
Australians in Palestine	Frank Hurley		Documentary	IMDb
Barry Butts In	Beaumont Smith	Barry Lupino, John Cosgrove, Agnes Dobson		9 August IMDb
Desert Gold	Beaumont Smith	Bryce Rowe, Marie Ney, John Cosgrove		24 March IMDb
Does the Jazz Lead to Destruction?	Fred Ward	Ethel Bennetto, George Irving	Comedy	4 August IMDb
The Face at the Window				
The Man From Kangaroo	E. J. Carroll, Snowy Baker	Snowy Baker		
The Sentimental Bloke	Raymond Longford	Arthur Tauchert, Lottie Lyell, Gilbert Emery	Drama / Romance	4 October IMDb
The Shadow of Lightning Ridge	E. J. Carroll, Snowy Baker	Snowy Baker		
South				
Struck Oil	Franklyn Barrett	Harry Roberts, Percy Walshe	Drama	20 October IMDb
Why Jessie Learned to Jazz	Fred Ward	Olga Willard-Turton (credited as Olga Willard)	Short	4 August IMDb

== See also ==
- 1910 in Australia
- 1911 in Australia
- 1912 in Australia
- 1913 in Australia
- 1914 in Australia
- 1915 in Australia
- 1916 in Australia
- 1917 in Australia
- 1918 in Australia
- 1919 in Australia
