= Stanley Walpole =

Australian actor (1886–1968)

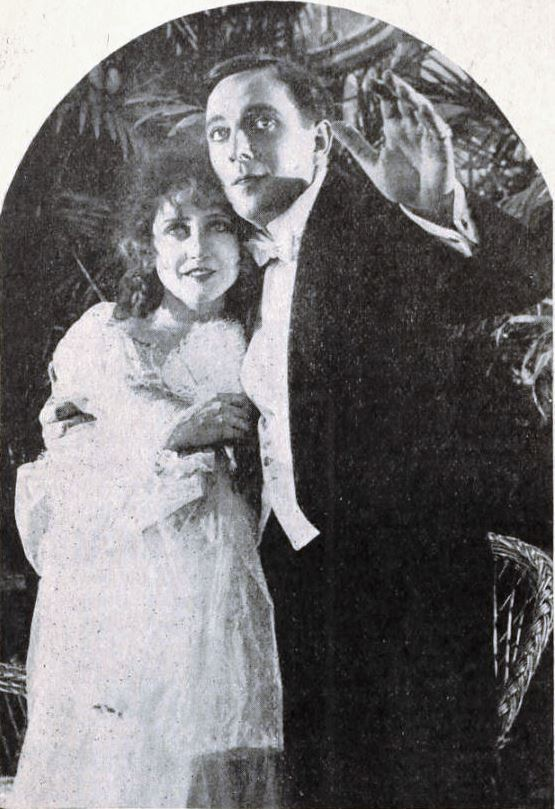
Still from The Seeds of Redemption (1917) with Claire Mersereau and Stanley Walpole.

Stanley Walpole (1886 – March 14, 1968) was an Australian actor of stage and screen who was one of the first Australians to succeed in American films.

== Biography ==
Walpole worked for Bland Holt, then with J.C. Williamson for six years.

He and his wife, Ethel Phillips, and Charles Villers were the resident actors for the Australian Photoplay Company.

In 1912, he moved to the USA and appeared in several films, becoming a leading man for the Eclair Company.

He returned to Australia for eight months in Melbourne, acting for J.C. Williamsons, then returned to the US and was signed by Julius Stern for Universal Heights.

== Select filmography ==
- Dan Morgan (1911)
- It Is Never Too Late to Mend (1911)
- Captain Starlight, or Gentleman of the Road (1911)
- Moora Neya, or The Message of the Spear (1911)
- What Women Suffer (1911)
- Cooee and the Echo (1912)
- The Cheat (1912)
- Whose Was the Hand? (1912)
- Death's Short Cut (1914)
- A Fiend and His Friends (1914)
- The Alibi (1917)
- In Walked Mary (1920)
- A Woman's Business (1920)
