= Will They Never Come? =

- The Sun 4 April 1915
- Directed by: Alfred Rolfe
- Written by: Phillip Gell; Loris Brown
- Based on: picture by Ellis Ashmead-Bartlett
- Starring: Guy Hastings
- Production company: Australasian Films
- Release date: 5 April 1915
- Running time: 2,000 feet
- Country: Australia
- Language: English

Will They Never Come? is a 1915 Australian film directed by Alfred Rolfe and starring Guy Hastings. It was based on a cartoon published by the Weekly Dispatch and the story "is based upon duty to one's country, in contradistinction to the younger members devoting their leisure to sport". It is considered a lost film.

== Premise ==
A hero enlists in the Australian army during World War I while his brother does not. But while the brother is at the races, surfing and cricket, he imagines that thousands are suffering because he shirked.

== Production ==
The film was written by two publicists from Australasian Films and was made with the co-operation of the Minister of Defence, Senator Pearce. Colonel Wallack and Majors Page and Sadler were the military liaisons.

It was shot at Liverpool using real members of the First Australian Imperial Force, who when the film was released were serving in the Dardanelles.

The lead role was played by the "very cockney comic lead of the late lamented George Blood Co."

== Reception ==
The film was very successful and resulted in a full-length sequel, The Hero of the Dardanelles (1915). Both films were used as a recruiting tool, taken around the country by members of the armed forces for special screenings. However, the original film did not feature any battle sequences.
