= Seadog =

Seadog, sea dog or clumsy animal may refer to:

== Arts and entertainment ==
- Sea Dogs (film), a 1916 U.S. silent film
- Sea Dogs (play), a 1939 Broadway play by Wilson Starbuck
- Sea Dogs (video game), a 2000 videogame
- Sea Dogs of Australia, a 1913 Australian silent film
- "Seadogs", an episode of the television series NCIS

== Sports ==
- Portland Sea Dogs, a baseball team
- Saint John Sea Dogs, an ice hockey team
- Scarborough Athletic F.C.
- The former Scarborough F.C.
- The fictional species of Raymond, the mascot for the Tampa Bay Rays baseball team

== People ==
- A sailor (slang)
- Elizabethan Sea Dogs, English adventurers of the Elizabethan era
- Sea Dog, a pseudonym used at one point in Wong Sun v. United States, 371 U.S. 471 (1963)
- Seadog Owners Association, a British club of owners of a Seadog Class sailing yacht

== Places ==
- Sea Dog Island, an uninhabited island in the Falkland Islands

== Animals ==
- A dog at sea (slang)
- A shark (antiquated)
- A pinniped, especially a gray seal

== Transportation and vehicles ==
- HMS Seadog, a WW2-era S-class submarine of the British Royal Navy
- USS Sea Dog, a WW2-era Balao-class submarine of the U.S. Navy
- Seadog 30, a British class of sailing yacht

== Other uses ==
- SEADOG pump, a wave-energy-based seawater pump

== See also ==
- Sea-Doo, a Canadian brand of personal water craft
- Dog (disambiguation)
- Sea (disambiguation)
