= The Crime and the Criminal =

- 18 February 1912 issue of Sunday Times
- Directed by: Alfred Rolfe
- Starring: Charles Villiers
- Production company: Australian Photo-Play Company
- Release date: 19 February 1912
- Running time: 3,000 feet
- Country: Australia
- Languages: Silent film English intertitles

The Crime and the Criminal is a 1912 Australian silent film directed by Alfred Rolfe. It features the same railway collision as the climax in Do Men Love Women? (1912) which had come out only a few weeks prior. However the plots of the movies are different.

The film was set in Sydney and the Kimberley.

It is considered a lost film.

== Premise ==
According to the Sydney Truth the film "deals with an intensely thrilling story, pictured with true melodramatic emphasis. Local coloring is faithfully introduced, and % big sensation is provided in a realistic railway smash. The jealous hatred of the unscrupulous criminal for bis successful brother provides a strong plot."

== Reception ==
The film debuted at the Alhambra Theatre in Sydney on 19 February. That theatre had just shown A Daughter of Australia.

The Sun said "the subject and plot are well constructed: : It should command the attention of picture lovers."

The Bulletin said the film "pulls the public leg to excess, and drags the long arm of coincidence out of joint and all reason."
