= Attack on the Gold Escort =

1911 film

- Border Watch 13 Sept 1911
- Starring: "The Bohemians at Geelong"
- Production company: Pathe Frere
- Release date: 19 June 1911
- Country: Australia
- Languages: Silent; English intertitles

Alternative title shown in West Australian 7 Aug 1911

Attack on the Gold Escort is a 1911 Australian silent Western film which is considered lost. It was sometimes known as Captain Midnight, King of the Bushrangers, or Attack of the Gold Escort, or Captain Starlight's Attack on the Gold Escort.

The film was called "an Exciting and Thrilling Reproduction of Australian Early Days. A vivid portrayal of bush adventure, acted by Australian artistes, amid Australian scenery" which was filmed "at the exact spot where the incident happened." (This was Captain Starlight's attack.)

The movie is often confused with Captain Midnight, the Bush King and Captain Starlight, or Gentleman of the Road. However, it seems it was a separate, much shorter, movie than those (the title may have been changed to cash in on the success of Captain Midnight and Captain Starlight).

== Plot ==
The gold escort from the Bank of Australia is attacked by bushrangers. It is chased down Evandsford Hill.

== Production ==
According to one paper "it is stated that the film was taken by Pathe Freres' representative on the spot where the attack was made."

== Reception ==
The film made its debut on 19 June 1911 in Geelong. It then played in Sydney, then throughout the country.

The Kapunda Herald said the film "portrayed the terrors of the road, during the time when bushranging was rife, in a vivid and realistic manner."
