= The Life of Rufus Dawes =

- Directed by: Alfred Rolfe
- Written by: Alfred Rolfe
- Based on: Thomas Somers' (aka Thomas Walke) (play adaptation); For the Term of His Natural Life (novel) by Marcus Clarke
- Produced by: Cosens Spencer
- Starring: Alfred Rolfe; Lily Dampier
- Cinematography: Ernest Higgins
- Edited by: Ernest Higgins
- Production company: Spencer's Pictures
- Distributed by: Sawyer (US)
- Release dates: 19 June 1911 (Sydney); 27 November 1911 (Melbourne)
- Running time: 4,000 feet
- Country: Australia
- Languages: Silent film English intertitles

The Life of Rufus Dawes is a 1911 Australian silent film based on Alfred Dampier's stage adaptation of the 1874 novel For the Term of His Natural Life produced by Cosens Spencer.

It was also known as The Story of Rufus Dawes, or the Term of His Natural Life or The Convict Hero.

The film was the third produced by Cosens Spencer, based on a popular stage adaptation by Thomas Somers, produced by Alfred Dampier. It starred Alfred Rolfe, his wife Lily Dampier and Raymond Longford. The others were Captain Midnight, the Bush King (1911) and Captain Starlight, or Gentleman of the Road (1911). Rolfe then left Spencer to work for the Australian Photo-Play Company under Stanley Crick.

It is considered a lost film.

== Synopsis ==
The film was divided into sections:

- ENGLAND – A room at Hampstead heath – Sir Richard Devine refuses to be blackmailed by Crofton, alias John Rex – The Scapepgrace Dick Devine quarrels with his father, Sir Richard Devine is cast off forever – Sir Richard awaiting Parson North is murdered by Rex – North discovers the body and secures his own forged bills – Dick, accused of murder gives his name as Rufus Dawes – Parson North denounces Rex as a notorious highwayman.
- VAN DIEMEN'S LAND – the convict settlement at Hell's Gate; life on the chain gang; Gabbet's escape and capture; the Rev. Meakin visits his flock; Chaplain North gives the convicts tobacco; Lt Frere threatens to report him; Major Vickers announces the move to Port Arthur; the attack by the convicts; the prisoner Troke saved by North; the departure from the settlement.
- THE MUTINY – on board the Osprey; the capture of the Osprey; the mutineers maroon the survivors
- WRECK OF THE OSPREY – the morning after.
- MAROONED – two weeks later Rufus Dawes saved by Sylvia Vickers. Rex, Crow and Gabbett starving, draw lots to decide who should be killed. The Ruffian Gabbett. Three months. Rufus Dawes builds a boat of goat skins to enable Mrs Vickers and Sylvia to escape from the island. Major Vickers and party search for the castaways. Rev Meekin's morning walk interrupted by Gabbet. Mrs Vickers killed by Gabbett. The shock deprives Sylvia of her memory. Lt Frere accuses Rufus Dawes of the crime.
- PORT ARTHUR – Dawes escapes from prison. Sylvia Vickers, now Mrs Frere, fails to recognise him at first but then it comes back. Her memory returning she demands to see him. Major Vickers returns with recaptured convicts. Lady Devine arrives to see her son.
- THE END – Rex and Gabbett confess to the murders of Sir Richard and Mrs Vickers. His innocence established and a pardon for Rufus Dawes.

Unlike the original novel and 1908 film version, this had a happy ending. This was in line with Spencer's version of Robbery Under Arms which had a happier ending than the original novel.

== Cast ==
- Alfred Rolfe as Rufus Dawes
- Lily Dampier as Sylvia
- Raymond Longford as Gabbett
- Lottie Lyell
- Stanley Walpole
- Augustus Neville

== Original play ==
The film was based on a stage play adaptation of the novel which Dampier had performed in.

== Production ==
It is likely the film was retitled to avoid confusion with another movie version of the novel that had been released in 1908.

Raymond Longford worked on the movie and later claimed to have been the actual director.

It appears from contemporary reviews that there was some filming at Port Arthur.

Scenes involving Raymond Longford, who played Gabbett, were shot at La Perouse, Sydney. According to a later article in Everyone's:

Longford, stripped to the waist, tattered and blood bespattered, was at the head of a cliff many yards away from the camera and the rest of the company, who were preparing to scale the cliff to attempt his capture. Longford forgot that he would be visible to those on the other side of the cliff, and was startled to hear a piercing shriek and turned in time to see a woman on the beach below, running as though for her life. He signalled to the others to stop the action, which they did, thinking that something had gone wrong. Longford then turned around to see it he could appease the woman’s alarm. She was not to be seen, but creeping towards him in single file he saw some fishermen and stragglers, armed with sticks, oars and any handy weapon. The position looked ugly, and he reckoned he was in for a bad time, so rising to his feet, he gave a hail, intending to reassure the attackers that all was well. As soon as they caught sight of him and his accoutrements they dropped their weapons and incontinently fled. After that scouts were posted around the locations to warn sightseers what they might expect to see.

== Release ==
The film was released in Sydney on 19 June 1911 at the Broadway Theatre. It was released in Melbourne on 27 November 1911 at the Olympic Theatre. It debuted in Launceston on 22 January 1912. (During the Launceston season, the film caught fire one night and the theatre had to be evacuated.)

Distribution of the film was blocked from legal action by Marcus Clarke's daughter, Marion Clarke.

=== Critical reception ===
The Sydney Truth called it "a striking production". It was described by The Argus as "an entirely original pictorial adaptation". The Kalgoorlie Miner wrote "the subject is treated magnificently, and every detail is perfectly carried out."

=== US release ===
It was bought for release in the US by Sawyers Pictures, who retitled the movie The Convict Hero.

== Notes ==
- Fotheringham, Richard, "Introduction", Robbery Under Arms by Alfred Dampier and Garnet Walch, Currency Press 1985
