= In Walked Mary =

1920 film directed by George Archainbaud

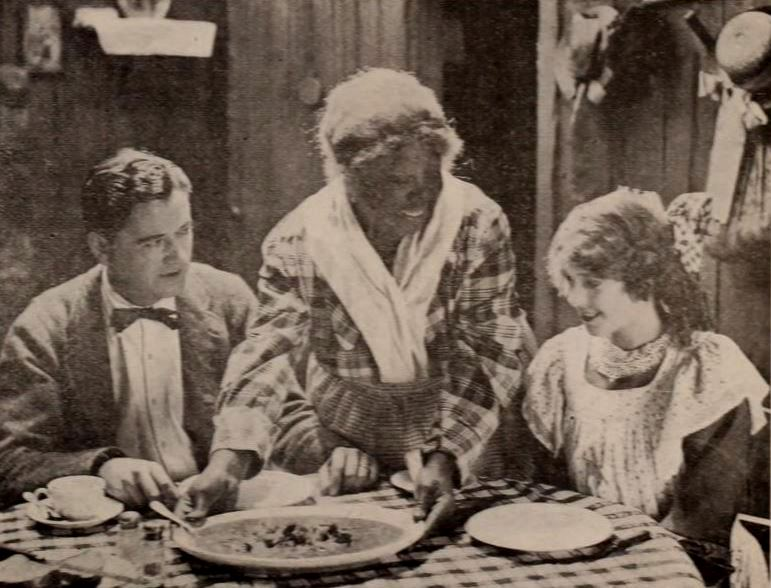
- Thomas Carrigan, Frances Miller and June Caprice in In Walked Mary
- Directed by: George Archainbaud
- Written by: Oliver D. Bailey (play); George DuBois Proctor
- Produced by: Albert Capellani
- Starring: June Caprice; Thomas Carrigan; Stanley Walpole
- Cinematography: Lucien Tainguy
- Production company: Albert Capellani Productions
- Distributed by: Pathé Exchange
- Release date: March 7, 1920
- Country: United States
- Languages: Silent; English intertitles

In Walked Mary is a 1920 American silent drama film directed by George Archainbaud and starring June Caprice, Thomas Carrigan and Stanley Walpole.

== Cast ==
- June Caprice as Mary Ann Hubbard
- Thomas Carrigan as Dick Allison
- Stanley Walpole as Wilbur Darcey
- Vivienne Osborne as Betsy Caldwell
- Frances Miller as Mammy

== Preservation status ==
- The film is preserved in the Library of Congress.

== Bibliography ==
- Christine Leteux. Albert Capellani: Pioneer of the Silent Screen. University Press of Kentucky, 2015.
