= Does the Jazz Lead to Destruction =

- Starring: Ethel Bennetto, George Irving
- Release date: 4 August 1919
- Country: Australia
- Languages: Silent film English intertitles

Does the Jazz Lead to Destruction? is a 1919 Australian silent film about the jazz craze. It is considered a lost film.

== Plot ==
A family of wowsers, the McWowses, oppose jazz dancing but are converted to its joys. Several dances are featured, including 'the Walking Waltz', 'the Jazz', 'the Tickle-Toe' and the 'Whirly Whirly'. These were performed by the leads.

== Production ==
Ethel Bennetto and George Irving were both dancers from Sydney who performed the dances in the film.

== Release ==
During the lead up to the film's release, letters from the fictitious characters, the McWowses, would appear in press advertising complaining about jazz.

The film is often confused with another jazz comedy, Why Jessie Learned to Jazz, for Australasian Films and director Frederick Ward, which was announced for production but was likely abandoned.
