= Snake Catching in Queensland =

1911 Australian documentary

- Production company: Australian Photoplay Company
- Release date: 1911
- Running time: 600 feet (approximately X minutes)
- Country: Australia
- Language: Silent

Snake Catching in Queensland is a 1911 Australian documentary from the Australian Photoplay Company.

It was 600 feet long.
