= Mates from the Murrumbidgee =

- Sunday Times 10 Sept 1911
- Directed by: Alfred Rolfe
- Starring: Charles Villiers
- Production company: Australian Photo-Play Company
- Release date: 11 September 1911
- Running time: 3,000 feet
- Country: Australia
- Languages: Silent film English intertitles

Mates from the Murrumbidgee is a 1911 Australian silent movie. It is considered a lost film and was arguably the first Australian war film, being set during the Boer War.

The movie was considered a financial success at the time.

== Plot ==
John, James and Mary are school friends, who grow up near the Murrumbidgee River. As they grow up both John and James fall for Mary, but Mary loves John. John and James work as drovers then join the Australian Lighthorse during the Second Boer War, both fighting for the New South Wales Lancers. While fighting with the Boers, John is seriously wounded. James comes back to Australia, says that John is dead, and marries Mary.

Mary ends up poisoning herself and one of the friends shoots the other.

The film includes a charge at Majuba Hill (even though that took place during the First Boer War). This was done "for the sake of the picturesque".

It also included a triumphant return to Sydney.

== Cast ==
- Charles Villiers

== Release and reception ==
The film was released on a double bill with Fighting Blood, an American Western. It was accompanied by a lecturer who would explain the plot; for many screenings, this was the noted comedian Charles Woods.

The Sun wrote, "The ingenuity displayed in the revelation of this story is remarkable. From a homestead on tho Murrumbldge one is carried to South Africa through some thrilling episodes of tho Boer War, and back again to Sydney." The Colac Herald described the film as "a gem of its kind". Punch said it "met with a tremendous reception, and showed that the locally produced films arc in no way inferior to the imported article. " The Daily Telegraph said it "proved exceedingly popular."

A 1923 article referred to the film being popular.
