= Australia Prepared =

- Production company: Australasian Films
- Distributed by: J and N Tait
- Release date: 10 July 1916
- Running time: 60 minutes
- Country: Australia
- Language: silent

Australia Prepared, as preserved by the Australian War Memorial organization

Australia Prepared is a 1916 Australian documentary film to show the country's preparation for World War I.

It was inspired by the British propaganda film Britain Prepared (1915) and was commissioned by Senator George Pearce. Filming took several months.

Unlike many Australian silent movies, a copy of it survives.
