= Ethel Knight Kelly =

Actress and writer

- Ethel Kelly, photographed by Harold Cazneaux c. 1920
- Born: Ethel Knight Mollison; 28 January 1875; Saint John, New Brunswick
- Died: 22 September 1949 (aged 74); Darlinghurst, New South Wales
- Other name: Ethel Knight Moore
- Occupations: Actress, writer
- Spouses: Edmund Canston Moore (married 1894-?); Thomas Herbert Kelly (married 1903–1948)
- Children: 4

Ethel Knight Kelly (born Ethel Knight Mollison, 28 January 1875 – 22 September 1949) was a Canadian–Australian actress, writer, and social leader. She appeared in a number of plays and wrote four books.

== Early life ==
Kelly was born in Saint John, New Brunswick, Canada. She was the elder daughter of Margaret Millen Mollison and William Knight Mollison. She married Edmund Canston Moore in New York City on 12 September 1894. The marriage was brief; one source states that Edmund died less than a year after the wedding.

== Career ==
She began her acting career with Olga Nethersole in 1894, and went on to appear in plays that included Cyrano de Bergerac and The Taming of the Shrew. She acted with a company headed by Augustin Daly and with George Holland's Stock Company. She appeared on Broadway in Beaucaire in 1901.

J. C. Williamson brought her to Australia for the play Are You a Mason? in 1903. Later that year she appeared in Madame Butterfly. She largely left acting after her second marriage, but she still sometimes performed in matinée shows. She appeared in The School for Scandal in 1917, and in her own play, Swords and Tea, in 1918. Also in 1918, she appeared in the silent film Cupid Camouflaged, credited as Mrs. T. H. Kelly.

Her first book was an account of her travels in India, titled Frivolous Peeps at India and published in 1911. In 1922, she became editor of the women's page of Smith's Weekly. In 1925, she published her first novel, Why the Sphinx Smiles. It was followed by Zara in 1927. She wrote a memoir, Twelve Milestones, which was published in 1929.

== Personal life ==
While in Australia she met businessman Thomas Herbert Kelly, the brother of Willie and Frederick Kelly. They married on 29 August 1903. They had two sons and two daughters. They remained married until his death in 1948.

From 1925 to 1934, she lived primarily in Florence, Italy, with her daughters. While in Italy she converted to Catholicism. She returned to Australia in 1934.

Kelly was an active fundraiser for hospitals and other charities, and was a prominent hostess for Sydney social events.

She died on 22 September 1949 at her home in Darlinghurst. She was survived by one of her sons and both of her daughters.
