= Texas Natural Resources, LLC =

Texas Natural Resources, LLC (TNR) is an American wave energy company based in Houston, Texas. It is the initial licensee of the SEADOG pump technology.

The company’s technology has been showcased in multiple energy conferences including the Gulf Coast Innovation Conference & Showcase and the Energy and Clean Technology Venture Forum. It also has had features in The Star Tribune, The Houston Business Journal, The Houston Chronicle, and Popular Mechanics.
