= A. O. Segerberg =

Australian cameraman

Albert Oscar Segerberg (1881 – 13 July 1941) was an Australian cameraman. He began shooting films as early as 1896, and later worked as a cameraman for Pathé Frères, the Australian Photo-Play Company and the Fraser brothers. He shot large numbers of newsreels, and industrial and educational documentaries, including his own series, Australia at Work.

Segerberg claimed to have taken the first moving pictures in Australia at the 1896 Melbourne Cup and shown it in the Opera House, Melbourne.

== Selected filmography ==
- Cooee and the Echo (1912)
- Whose Was the Hand? (1912)
- The Moira, or Mystery of the Bush (1912)
- The Rebel (1915)
- The Mutiny of the Bounty (1916)
- The Hayseeds' Back-blocks Show (1917)
- The Hayseeds Come to Sydney (1917)
- The Hayseeds' Melbourne Cup (1918)
- A Romance of Burke and Wills Expedition of 1860 (1918)
