= The Clue of the Lost Handkerchief =

The Clue of the Last Handkerchief
- Production company: Australian Photoplay Company
- Release date: 1913
- Running time: 2500 feet
- Country: Australia
- Languages: Silent film English intertitles

The Clue of the Last Handkerchief is a 1913 Australian film. It was "a detective drama."

The film was previewed in Sydney in August 1913.
