= Those Terrible Twins =

1925 film

- Directed by: J.E. Ward
- Starring: Ray Griffen
- Production company: J.E. Ward Productions
- Distributed by: First National
- Release date: 25 July 1925
- Running time: six acts
- Country: Australia
- Languages: Silent film English intertitles

Those Terrible Twins is a 1925 Australian silent film directed J.E. Ward, a Papuan adventurer, who had previously made Australia's Own (1919). It is a slapstick comedy about the character Ginger Meggs.

About 35 minutes of the film survives.

The plot revolves around Ginger Meggs and his twin sister.

== Cast ==
- Ray Griffen as Ginger Meggs
- Bill Canstell as Bluey
- Kitty Willoby as Susan Meggs

== Reception ==
The movie first screened privately in Sydney in May 1925 before being released as a support feature later. The critic from the Sydney Morning Herald felt that the film was clearly modelled on American movies:

"The little sketches beneath the text of the captions exactly resemble those that adorn the Christie comedies. There are pie-slinging episodes, bathing beauties, crooks, who raid Jewellers shops, and scenes in which undergarments play a prominent part. The dissolving view, where a man knocked unconscious, sees a vision of dancing fairies - in this case one dancing fairy – has had quite a vogue in America since Charlie Chaplin used it as one of the features of "Sunnyside." It may be an accident that one of Mr. Ward's crooks bears the same name ("Spike" Malone), as a shady character in Richard Dix"s picture "Manhattan", released here a few weeks ago. These efforts to achieve variety by patching together the most diversely coloured materials, from gaudy farce to sombre melodrama, have succeeded only in leaving the story rambling and incoherent. It is, in fact, but a series of incidents. There has been no attempt in the settings, to take advantage of the city's natural beauties. One realizes that Australian producers cannot afford to spend large sums on elaborate interiors, and so forth; but surely we are entitled to look for something more attractive than back lanes."

The Bulletin reported that the film "sticks closely to Yankee traditions and alternates pie-slinging and the like with maudlin melodrama."
