= The Opium Runners =

- Production company: The Gaumont Agency
- Release date: 30 April 1913 (Illawarra)
- Running time: 2,000 feet
- Country: Australia
- Languages: Silent film English intertitles

The Opium Runners is a 1913 Australian silent film. It is considered a lost film.

It was made by the Gaumont Agency who also made Call of the Bush (1912).

It is possible the movie was based on a collection of short stories called The Opium Runners by FRC Hopkins, who had also written All for Gold.

It was advertised as "A Picture that makes you rise from your seat' with excitement A Story with a Perfect Plot and Exceptional' Acting, 'showing many Pretty Typical Scenes of the Australian Bush."
