= Caloola, or The Adventures of a Jackeroo =

- Directed by: Alfred Rolfe
- Based on: novel Caloola by Clement Pratt
- Production company: Australian Photo-Play Company
- Release date: 16 October 1911
- Running time: 2,000 feet
- Country: Australia
- Languages: Silent film English intertitles

Caloola, or The Adventures of a Jackeroo is a 1911 Australian silent film directed by Alfred Rolfe based on a novel published the previous year by Clement Pratt.

It is considered a lost film.

== Plot ==
An Englishman, Charlie Hargreaves, is falsely accused of an embezzlement and goes to Australia, where he finds work as a jackeroo at Caloola Station. He falls in love with Hilda, the station owner's daughter, but they are both captured by aboriginals.

The girl's parents arrange a search party and come to the rescue, but the chief of the tribe takes the girl. He is about to throw her over a cliff when the jackeroo comes to the rescue. He encounters a bushfire and manages to escape death in a watery grave.

Chapter headings were:

- Falsely' accused, Dismissed,
- A stranger in a strange land,
- The Jackeroo,
- At Caloola,
- Mutual admiration,
- The bush fire,
- The' alarm,
- At the point of death,
- A timely rescue,
- Love's awakening,
- A cowardly assault,
- Captured by Black,
- Saved from a watery grave,
- Off for the honeymoon.

== Cast ==
- Charles Villiers

== Release ==
The movie was advertised as being available for release on 4 October 1911.

The bushfire sequence was heavily promoted in advertising.

One report said the film had been "a strong draw".
