= The Sin of a Woman =

- Directed by: Alfred Rolfe
- Starring: Charles Villiers
- Production company: Australian Photo-Play Company
- Release date: 29 January 1912
- Running time: 2,000 feet or 3,000 feet
- Country: Australia
- Languages: Silent film English intertitles

The Sin of a Woman is a 1912 Australian silent film directed by Alfred Rolfe.

It is considered a lost film.

== Plot ==
Dick Maxwell, a young man from Sydney, decides to move to the country for his health and gets a job as book keeper on Waroonga Station, near Orange, New South Wales. During his farewell dinner he becomes drunk and winds up getting married at a marriage shop to Tilly Farmfield, "a young woman of doubtful character". After the ceremony, his friend Bob Lambert rescues Dick from Tilly as they arrive at the Night Birds' Club. The next day Dick heads out to Waroonga, ignorant of the fact he is married.

At the station, Dick falls for Clarice Inglehurst, his employer's daughter, who feels the same way about him – much to the anger of Martin Tracey, the station manager, who is in love with Clarice. While out riding, Dick comes across Geebung, an aboriginal who has been bitten by a snake, lying by the road side. Dick ties a ligature around Geebung's leg, and sends him home on his horse. Geebung arrives at the homestead immediately after Clarice's rejection of Tracey, who vents his wrath on Geebung by whipping him. Dick arrives and rescues Geebung. Tracey is about to rush on Dick when Clarice interferes, asking for an explanation. Dick and Tracey remain silent, but Geebung tells her what happened. Tracey swears revenge on Dick.

He soon finds his chance with an order to send sheep to Flemington Saleyards. Tracey forges an entry in the railway book to make it appear that Dick has stolen 200 sheep. He is seen by Geebung, whom he shoots, then tells Mrs. Inglehurst of Dick's dishonesty. Dick is arrested, but Geebung, who has been found by Clarice, arrives in time to free Dick.

Tracey escapes and goes to Sydney, where he meets Tilly, who is an old friend, and they resolve to ruin Dick and Clarice on their wedding day. They leave Sydney for Orange, but Tilly is seriously injured on the way. Tracey continues his journey, with Tilly's marriage certificate. Tilly, dying, repents of her evil doings, and writes a confession, which she persuades a nurse to take to Dick. The nurse arrives at the church in time to set everything right. Geebung recognises Tracey through his disguise, and he is re-arrested. Tilly dies a minute before the commencement of the ceremony, allowing Dick and Clarice to be legally married.

== Production ==
The film was shot partly on location in Orange.

== Release ==
The film was advertised as "the Best Picture ever produced by the Australian Photo-Play Company.

== Cast ==
- Charles Villiers
