= In the Nick of Time (1911 film) =

- Sunday Times 3 Sept 1911
- Directed by: Alfred Rolfe
- Production company: Australian Photo-Play Company
- Release date: 4 September 1911
- Running time: 1,200 feet
- Country: Australia
- Languages: Silent film English intertitles

In the Nick of Time is a 1911 Australian silent film directed by Alfred Rolfe. It was described as a "sensational railway drama", although now is considered a lost film.

It featured a fight on the footboard of a train.

It was called a "special feature", as in it had a shorter running time. The movie came from the Australian Photoplay Company.

== Plot ==
The film featured two main sequences:

- the ride for life
- a murderous fight on the footboard of the train

== Reception ==
One critic, from the Daily Herald, called it "easily the best of the A.P.P. Company's many brilliant dramatic productions."
