= Australians in Egypt =

1915 film by Vic Newton

Australians in Egypt is a 1915 Australian documentary film about Australian troops in Egypt during the First World War made by Vic Newton. It was used as a recruiting tool for the Australian Department of Defence and was shown in towns throughout Australia.
