= The Day (1914 film) =

- Sydney Morning Herald 6 November 1914
- Directed by: Alfred Rolfe
- Written by: Johnson Weir
- Based on: poem by Henry Chappell
- Produced by: Archie Fraser; Colin Fraser
- Production company: Fraser Film Release and Photographic Company
- Release date: 11 November 1914
- Country: Australia
- Languages: Silent film English intertitles

The Day is a 1914 Australian silent film directed by Alfred Rolfe. It is a propaganda film about German brutality in Europe during World War I. It is considered a lost film.

Archie Fraser, who produced, called it "Der Tag, a little one-act scene, to be played whilst the celebrated poem by the English railway porter on The Day was being recited."

== Production ==
The Fraser brothers were two distributors and exhibitors who occasionally dabbled in production. They had just made a number of films with Raymond Longford but he had left and Alfred Rolfe became their in-house director instead.

The script was adapted from a popular poem by railway porter Henry Chappell. The screenplay was written by actor Johnson Weir. Weir would recite the poem during screenings.

Actor Jame Martin played a Belgian civilian attacked by two German soldiers. During filming he was struck by a bayonet and had to be treated at St Vincents Hospital.

The Referee wrote that the film " is a theme patriotic from opening to end, and it promises to prove a crowded house magnet."
