= A Coo-ee from Home =

- Directed by: Charles Woods
- Starring: Bryce Rowe; Gertrude Davey; Charles Villiers
- Cinematography: Tasman Higgins
- Production company: Woods' Australian Films
- Distributed by: Woods' Australian Films
- Release date: 14 January 1918
- Running time: 8,000 feet
- Country: Australia
- Languages: Silent film English intertitles

A Coo-ee from Home is a 1918 Australian silent film directed by Charles Woods about a miner who falls in love with a wealthy heiress. During filming a climactic shark attack, leading actor Bryce Rowe was attacked by a real shark and almost died.

== Plot ==
Miner Will Morrison marries heiress Grace Norwood. Jealous Richard Myers tries to convince Will that Grace is unfaithful and when that fails he drugs Will and frames him for murder. Will is sentenced to death but a prison chaplain helps him escape. He runs away to sea, is exposed on board, jumps into the water, is attacked by a shark, but he manages to fight it off and escape. He reads that Richard has been arrested for murder back home. Will returns home and marries Grave.

== Cast ==
- Gertrude Darley as Grace Norwood
- Bryce Rowe as Will Morrison
- Charles Villiers
- Charles Woods

== Production ==
During filming the shark attack sequence, actor Bryce Rowe was attacked by a real shark and almost died. He had to spend two weeks in hospital.

== Release ==
The fight between Will and the shark was heavily publicised on release.
