= Yachts and Hearts, or The Opium Smugglers =

- Directed by: Charles Byers Coates
- Starring: Beryl Clifton; Chris Olsen
- Cinematography: G.L. Gouday
- Production company: Antipodes Films
- Release date: 25 March 1918
- Running time: 5 reels
- Country: Australia
- Languages: Silent film English intertitles

Yachts and Hearts, or The Opium Smugglers is a 1918 Australian silent film about opium smugglers in Sydney.

It is considered a lost film.

== Plot ==
Opium smugglers work in Sydney. There is a car chase which ends in a crash, a cabaret which turns into a church, a yacht race in Sydney harbour, and 40 bathing beauties.

According to one contemporary report the film consisted of "5 heart throbbing acts, wholly and solely produced in Australia by Antipodes Films. See the great motor smash, police raid on gambling saloon, and a girl's thrilling biplane flight over Sydney."

== Cast ==
- Beryl Clifton as Ella Deane
- Chris Olsen as Maurice Dean
- Arthur Spence as detective
- Clare St Clair as Mrs Friedman
- Billie Monckton as crippled boy
- Edith Clarke
- Vera Chamberlain
- Melville Stevenson
- Dorothy and Lola Campbell
- David Edelsten
- Marjorie Sergeant

== Production ==
This was the second movie from Antipodes Films, who had previously made A Romance of Burke and Wills Expedition of 1860. The movie was shot in January 1918.

== Release ==
The film seems to have made little impact. It played as a support feature in some cinemas.

Antipodes made no more movies.
