= The Miner's Daughter =

1927 film

- Directed by: Leo Forbert
- Produced by: Charles James MacLaren
- Starring: Bert McCarthy
- Production company: Southern Cross Productions
- Distributed by: A. R. Harwood
- Release date: 1927
- Country: Australia
- Languages: Silent film English intertitles
- Budget: £1,000

The Miner's Daughter is a 1927 Australian silent film set in Sydney and Bendigo. Little is known about it and it is considered a lost film.

Everyone's said it was "reported on without much enthusiasm."

== Production ==
It was directed by a Polish photographer, art director and film producer, Leon Forbert, who was visiting Australia in the late 1920s. The star was boxer Bert McCarthy, Australia's featherweight champion at the time. Finance was allegedly provided by members of Melbourne's Jewish community.

== Release ==
A. R. Harwood distributed the movie but had little success.

Bert McCarthy died in 1931 after being knocked unconscious during a fight. Ten years previously boxer Denico Cabanella had died after a fight with McCarthy.
