= Way Outback =

- Directed by: Alfred Rolfe
- Starring: Charles Villiers "well known Australian artists"
- Production company: Australian Photo-Play Company
- Release date: 25 September 1911
- Running time: 1,000 feet
- Country: Australia
- Languages: Silent film English intertitles

Way Outback is a 1911 Australian silent film directed by Alfred Rolfe. It was described as "a typical Australian story of mining life in the back blocks" and being "full of action and incident".

It is considered a lost film.

== Plot ==
A young miner, Jack Somers, is in love with school teacher Ruby Clarke, in the back country. However she is in love with the local trooper, Billy Hayes.

Somers decides to sell his mine and leave town. While coming out of the warden's office he counts the money he has received in payment, and is seen by the notorious Black Reegan, who decides to rob him.

Reengan is gambling in the pub when Somers comes in. Reegan picks a fight with Somers, which is interrupted by Trooper Hayes. Hayes interrupts the fight, but Reegan escapes with Hayes' revolver as Hayes knocks out Somers.

Somers goes to get his horse and is shot with Hayes' revolver by Reegan, who leaves the weapon near the body. Hayes is eventually accused of the murder of Somers. He is arrested by escapes from jail and flees into the bust.

Hayes come across Reegan's camp. Reegan hits him over the head with a piece of wood. Hayes chases after Reegan and captures him.

The chapter headings were:

- Rivals in Love
- Planning the Robbery
- the Quarrel
- Trooper Hayes to the Rescue
- the Murder and Robbery
- the Escape
- the Murderer's Track
- a Cowardly Blow
- the Confession.
