= The Cup Winner =

- Based on: play by Philip Lytton and William Lee
- Starring: Charles Villiers
- Production company: Australian Photo-Play Company
- Release dates: 7 November 1911 (Melbourne); 8 November 1911 (Sydney)
- Running time: 3,000 feet or 2,400 feet
- Country: Australia
- Languages: Silent film English intertitles

The Cup Winner is a 1911 Australian silent film directed by Alfred Rolfe. It is set against a backdrop of horseracing and the finale involves real footage from the 1911 Melbourne Cup.

It was also known as Doping the Favourite.

== Synopsis ==
Richard Avendal is married with a young son. His wife is being blackmailed by a scoundrel who knows the wife's brother is in prison on a serious charge and demands money for his silence. Avendal sees his wife together with the blackmailer and believes he has been unfaithful.

Avendal divorces his wife and gives away their young baby son to an Italian organ grinder. The Italian places the baby in a training stable where he is found by the stable's owner and adopted into his family.

The boy, named Crossie, grows up and becomes a jockey, riding a horse in the Melbourne Cup owned by Richard Avendal. The villain and a comic Jewish bookmaker try to force Crossie to dope the horse but he refuses and rides to victory. The son is reunited with his father via the organ grinder, and Avendal discovers his wife is innocent.

The chapter headings were:

- 'Black mail'
- 'A misunderstanding'
- 'Jealousy'
- 'Divorced'
- 'Abandoned'
- 'Crossie, the Stable Boy'
- Trials for the Melbourne Cup
- 'The Spy'
- 'The Cup'
- 'The Burning Stables'
- 'Doping the Favorite'
- 'Tattersall's Club'
- 'Paying against the Favorite'
- 'The race for the Melbourne Cup, 1911'
- 'Crossie rides his father's horse to victory'
- 'The Welsher'
- 'Crossie restored to his parents'
- 'A happy ending'

== Cast ==
- Charles Villiers

== Original play ==
The Cup Winner
- Original language: English
- Written by: Philip Lytton; J. C. Lee
- Genre: Melodrama

Premiere
- Date: 1907

The film was based on a play which Philip Lytton toured around Australia from 1907 to 1909.

A Brisbane production centred on the Ascot Gold Cup and involved fourteen real horses racing on stage.

The plot involved Richard Avenal's happy home being wrecked by a blackmailer, Stephen Warland. Avenal's horse Kitchener participates in a horse race against Old Stocking, the blackmailer's horse.

== Production and release ==
The film was shot in Sydney in 1911, with additional footage shot at the real 1911 Melbourne Cup by six cameramen. (The Cup was won that year by The Parisian.)

The footage was processed immediately and shown that night, 7 November 1911, at five Melbourne theatres. It was copied and screened in Sydney theatres the next day. Screenings were usually accompanied by a lecturer.

== Reception ==
The gimmick proved successful and the movie became a major hit around the country, screening as late as February 1912.

The critic from the Launceston Examiner said the film "justified all that was written of it. It is unquestionably one of the most thorough and most interesting of the Australian Photo-Play Company's productions, and a stirring dramatic story." The Sydney Morning Herald said the film "does not depend on that scene [the Melbourne cup] for its interest, the human side of the drama, where all the varying emotions are admirably portrayed, being absorbing."

The Evening News called it a "splendid picture".

The film was a financial success.
