= A Miner's Luck =

- Production company: Photo Vista Company
- Distributed by: Pathe Freres
- Release date: 1911
- Running time: 17 mins
- Country: Australia
- Languages: Silent film English intertitles

A Miner's Luck is a 1911 Australian silent drama film.

Not much is known about who made it, although unlike many Australian silent films, part of it survives today.

== Plot ==
In the Australia bush, Mary goes to the mine with her father's dinner. Old Geordy learns that a prospective buyer is coming to inspect his mine.

Mary goes home and is saved by Jack from the insulting attentions of dissolute Jim.

A company promoter arrives home from the city to visit 'Possum Gully' and inspect the mine. The mine is sold and old Geordy receives 250 pounds deposit. Jim's presence is overlooked.

Old Geordy descends the shaft. Jim tries to rob his employer. Mary entertains the promoter with afternoon tea. Old Geordy makes futile attempts to ascend the shaft.

Vera discovers his plight and goes for help. Mary learns of her father's dreadful position. Jack succeeds in rescuing old Geordy. Jim falls victim to more whisky and is robbed of the stolen money by 'Sunny Bill'. Vera obtains the swag containing the stolen money. Old Geordy is brought home.

== Production ==
The film was the first in what was meant to be a series of films from Photo Vista. It was shot in and around Beaconsfield.

== Reception ==
Table Talk wrote that "the piece is entirely original and has some very novel scenes of Australian bush and mining life as a setting for a most interesting story... A good deal of interest is being shown in the production, as it is the first, of a series of original Australian films under taken by the Photo-vista, Co., and every effort has been made to ensure success."
