= Alfred Rolfe =

Australian stage and film director and actor

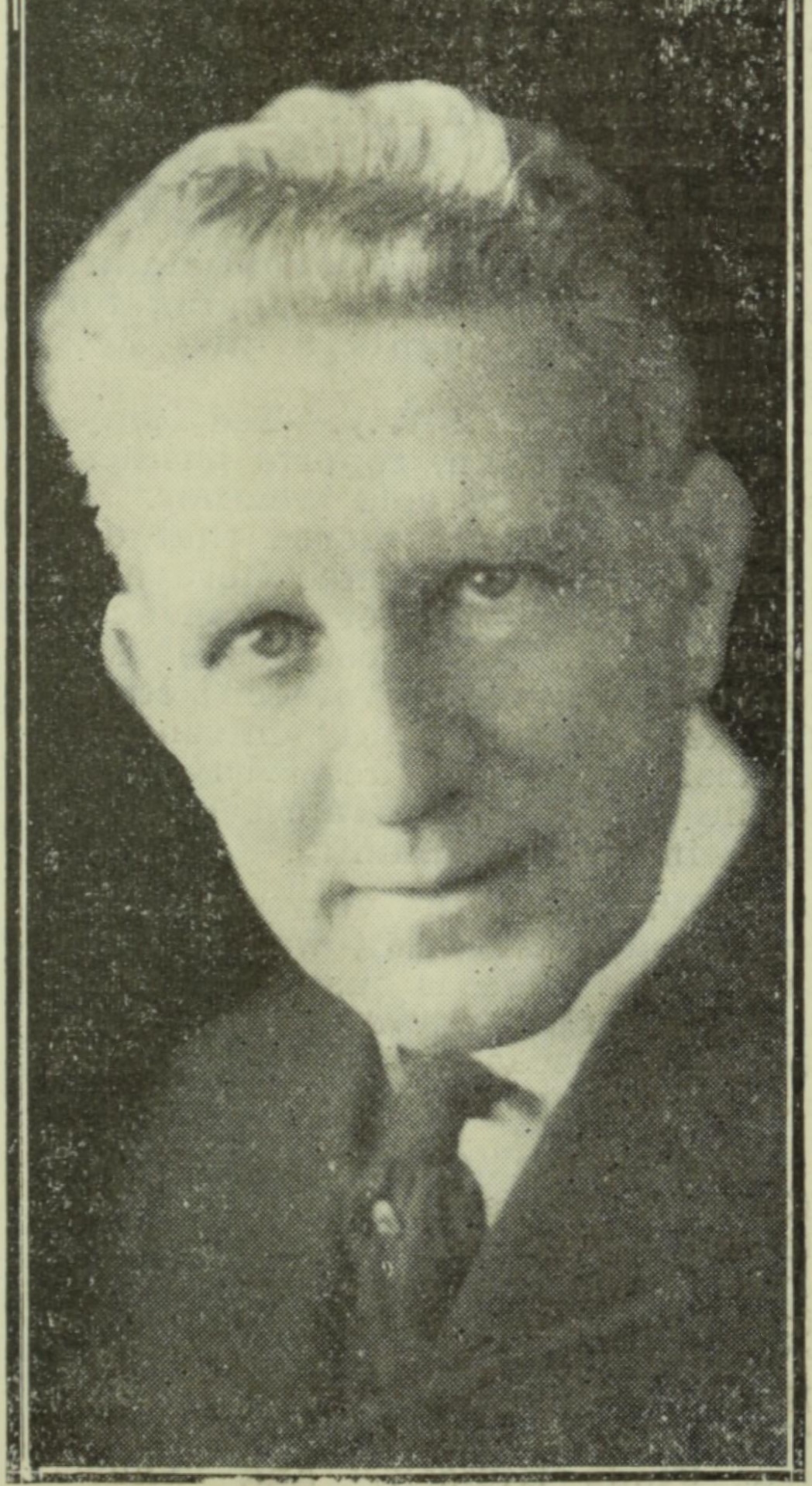
- Portrait of Alfred Rolfe (published in 1922).
- Born: Alfred Roker; 1862; Fitzroy, Victoria, Australia
- Died: 9 September 1943 (aged 81); North Sydney, New South Wales, Australia
- Occupations: stage and screen actor, stage and screen director
- Spouse: Katherine Annabel Ely ('Lily') Dampier
- Parent(s): Arthur Roker & Mary Ann (née Holman)

Alfred Rolfe, real name Alfred Roker (1862 – 9 September 1943), was an Australian stage and film director and actor, best known for being the son-in-law of the celebrated actor-manager Alfred Dampier, with whom he appeared frequently on stage, and for his prolific output as a director during Australia's silent era, including Captain Midnight, the Bush King (1911), Captain Starlight, or Gentleman of the Road (1911) and The Hero of the Dardanelles (1915). Only one of his films as director survives today.

== Biography ==
Alfred Roker was born in 1862 in the Melbourne suburb of Fitzroy, the son of Arthur Roker & Mary Ann (née Holman).

He used the stage-name 'Alfred Rolfe' when he began working as an actor. Rolfe joined Charles Holloway's acting company, where he acted alongside Richard Stewart and Essie Jenyns.

In 1888 Rolfe toured New Zealand in George Darrell's company.

=== Alfred Dampier ===
He then joined the Alfred Dampier Company in 1890, first appearing in Robbery Under Arms. He mostly played smaller parts but in 1892 was promoted to the role of Mercutio in Romeo and Juliet. The following year Rolfe married Dampier's daughter Lily. Rolfe acted opposite his wife and father-in-law numerous times around the country throughout the 1890s and early 1900s, most commonly playing juvenile leads.

=== England ===
In November 1897, Rolfe sailed for London with his wife and her parents. While there they managed to get work in two plays which toured all over the country and ended up staying for twelve months.

They returned in 1899 and rejoined the Alfred Dampier Company. Among the plays in which Rolfe most frequently appeared opposite his wife and father in law were The Bush King, Robbery Under Arms, and East Lynne.

According to New Zealand's Stage magazine, Rolfe was "an actor of brilliancy on a somewhat wide range, a little overshadowed, perhaps, by the stars with whom he has been so long associated, but by no means obscured."

In February 1907 Rolfe left for London with Lily Dampier and her parents once again. Once again, they worked for a period over there. Alfred Dampier came home, seriously ill, meaning his company was unable to continue. Rolfe was reported as "walking through his vast estates, plantations, and so on" in his spare time. He and Lily also briefly took over the lead in a play with another company. Dampier died in May 1908.

=== Philip Lytton ===
In early 1909, Rolfe was credited as "general manager" on a series of advertisements throughout New South Wales for a £5,000 film depicting the fight between Tommy Burns and Jack Johnson. It is possible this meant Rolfe directed the movie, or was in charge of its distribution.

In August 1910 it was announced Rolfe and Lily were joining Philip Lytton's company for a tour of country Australia and New Zealand. They played several of the Dampier repertoire, including Robbery Under Arms. In September 1910 he and Lily headed Lytton's company, where the line-up of plays included Robbery Under Arms (play)|Robbery Under Arms, The Bush King and The Fatal Wedding; all three would soon be turned into films by Cosens Spencer with Rolfe directing and acting in the first two.

=== Filmmaker ===
In 1910 Rolfe received an offer to direct three films for Cosens Spencer, all adaptations of productions performed by his father-in-law's and Lytton's company: Captain Midnight, the Bush King, Captain Starlight, or the Gentleman of the Road (an adaptation of Robbery Under Arms), and The Life of Rufus Dawes. Rolfe and his wife also appeared in all three films, the first two especially which appear to have been very successful critically and commercially. He was assisted on the films by Raymond Longford, who later claimed to have directed the movies. He also appears to have directed Dan Morgan for Spencer.

When Rolfe left Spencer, the producer then hired Longford to make his directorial debut with a film adaptation of The Fatal Wedding.

=== Australian Photo-Play Company ===
Rolfe left Spencer to take up an offer from Stanley Crick to work at a new film production company, the Australian Photo-Play Company. Rolfe ended up making an estimated 25 features for them, including Australia's first war movie (Mates of the Murrumbidgee (1911)), and first film to deal with aboriginal Australians (Moora Neya, or The Message of the Spear (1911)).

Rolfe seems to have worked less as an actor during this time, although he would occasionally appear in the films. He directed almost every one of Australian Photo-Play's films.

=== Fraser Films ===
After the demise of the Australian Photo-Play Company, Rolfe moved over to Fraser Films, where his movies included adaptations of the popular play The Sunny South (1914) and the poem The Day.

In November 1914 it was reported Rolfe and Lily Dampier were "wandering the globe".

=== Australasian Films ===
Fraser Films soon ceased production. From 1915 to 1916 Rolfe worked for Australasian Films, directing shorts, industrial films and features. He was directing a film in Sydney in February 1915 when his wife Lily died in Melbourne.

Rolfe's feature work for Australasian Films included two immensely popular war films, Will they Never Come? (1915) and its sequel, The Hero of the Dardanelles (1915). A movie about the Eureka Rebellion, The Loyal Rebel (1915), was less successful. He then made two more World War I-related movies, How We Beat the Emden (1915) and A Man – That's All (1916); these were used to recruit soldiers.

In May 1916 it was reported that Rolfe had "produced more Australian pictures than any other Australian director". Rolfe said at the same time the greatest difficulty for Australian filmmakers is they are unable to market their films in America or England. "If this could be remedied", said Mr. Rolfe, "as many as fifty copies of any picture would be required and the production would then show a 'worth-while' profit." But in 1916 Australia only four copies could be disposed of "which does not make much of an inducement to intending manufacturers."

In July 1916 it was reported Rolfe had just finished directing a series of educational films for Australasian Pictures, each one about one reel long, adding up to 15,000 feet of film in all.

In November 1916 it was announced in the trade press that Rolfe had "severed his connection with Australasian Films after a long period of service. He has just completed a big industrial subject for this film dealing with practically every Australian industry of note."

=== Retirement ===
Rolfe eventually retired from show business, although he did direct one more film, for charity – the Red Cross sponsored feature Cupid Camouflaged (1918). As Lily Dampier's widower, he appears to have inherited the rights to Alfred Dampier's plays, particularly Robbery Under Arms and The Bush King, and authorized various stage productions of these. In 1920 he registered a new script based on The Bush King for copyright, but no film of this was made.

Rolfe had been involved in amateur athletics for a number of years, particularly the East Sydney Amateur Athletics Company, but focused on it increasingly from 1917 through the 1920s.

Rolfe lived in Sydney towards the end of his life. He and Lily had a son, Sidney Alfred Rolfe, who was an artist. He also occasionally appeared on stage and managed a warehouse.

== Appraisal ==
Only one of Rolfe's films survives today, The Hero of the Dardanelles, but according to film historians Graham Shirley and Brian Adams:

It indicates a director skilled in the type of visual and naturalistic sophistication later attributed to Raymond Longford. The conventions of spectacle melodrama so favoured in late nineteenth century Australian theatre, with their realistic settings and real chases on horsebacks and trainwrecks, played a large role in the films he made for Australian Photo-Play in 1911–12. If reviews of other films are an indication, Rolfe's work for Cosens Spencer and Australian Photo-Play had helped refine the achievement of naturalistic performances for the screen, not to say the basis of a screen grammar that vividly captured setting and spectacle.

== Personal life ==
In the 1890s, Rolfe backed the race horse Cremorne.

== Select filmography ==
=== Dramatic films ===
- Captain Midnight, the Bush King (1911) – also acted
- Captain Starlight, or Gentleman of the Road (1911) – also acted
- The Life of Rufus Dawes (1911) – also acted
- Dan Morgan (1911) – also acted
- Moora Neya, or The Message of the Spear (1911)
- The Lady Outlaw (1911)
- Mates of the Murrumbidgee (1911)
- In the Nick of Time (1911)
- Way Outback (1911)
- What Women Suffer (1911) – also acted
- The Cup Winner (1911)
- Caloola, or The Adventures of a Jackeroo (1911)
- The Miner's Curse (1911)
- King of the Coiners (1912)
- Do Men Love Women? (1912)
- The Sin of a Woman (1912)
- The Crime and the Criminal (1912)
- Cooee and the Echo (1912)
- The Love Tyrant (1912)
- The Cheat (1912)
- Won on the Post (1912)
- Whose Was the Hand? (1912)
- The Moira, or Mystery of the Bush (1912)
- The Day (1914)
- The Sunny South or The Whirlwind of Fate (1915)
- Will they Never Come? (1915)
- The Hero of the Dardanelles (1915)
- The Loyal Rebel (1915)
- How We Beat the Emden (1915)
- A Man – That's All (1916)
- Cupid Camouflaged (1918)

=== Industrial films ===
- The Burns-Johnson Fight (1908) – Rolfe was "general manager"
- Australia – a Nation (1916) – series of industrial films about the Australian war effort for Australasian Films shot by Lacey Percival – include one on the Murrumbidgee area, one on Burrinjuck Darm, and one on Bundaberg

== Select theatre credits ==
=== Holloway Dramatic Company ===
- The Naked Truth by George Darrell (May, 1883) – world premiere – Opera House, Melbourne – Darrell starred
- Queen's Evidence/Lights o' London/ Much Ado About Nothing/ The Two Orphans (Aug-Oct 1883) – Theatre Royal, Brisbane
- Lights o' London (October 1883) – Newcastle
- Othello by William Shakespeare (February 1884) – Launceston
- The Wages of Sin by Frank Harvey (March, 1884) – Melbourne
- Lights o' London/ The Silver King/ Much Ado About Nothing (June-Aug 1884) – Queensland tour, including Brisbane
- Clouds/ Jane Shore/ Love's Sacrifice/ Bluebeard (Nov-Dec 1884) – Christchurch, Wellington, Napier
- A Ring of Iron by Frank Harvey/Romeo and Juliet/A Mad Marriage by Frank Harvey/Hamlet/ Ingomar/Cymbeline/Much Ado About Nothing (Feb-April 1886) – tour of Tasmania – mostly Launceston, Hobart
- A Ring of Iron (May, 1886) – Goulbourn
- A Ring of Iron/Ingomar/Saints and Sinners by H. A. Jones/Hamlet/Cymbeline (June-Sept 1886) – Brisbane
- Saints and Sinners/Hamlet/A Mad Marriage/Cymbeline (Jan-March 1887) – Tasmania tour
- Cymbeline/Romeo and Juliet (April 1887) – Bendigo
- A Ring of Iron/Guiltless by Arthur Shirley/Wages of Sin/Heroes by Conward Edwards (June-Aug 1887) – Queensland tour, including Brisbane, Gympie
- Romeo and Juliet/Twelfth Night/The Merchant of Venice/Much Ado About Nothing/Cymbeline/Leah the Jewish Maiden by Mosnethal (Sept-Dec 1887) – Sydney
- Hoodman Blind/The Ring of Iron (Dec 1887) – Newcastle
- Romeo and Juliet/Ingomar (Jan-March 1888) – Melbourne
- Hoodman Blind/Twelfth Night/The Merchant of Venice/The Magistrate (May 1888) – Tasmania tour
- The Merchant of Venice/ Twelfth Night/ Ingomar/ Pygmalion and Galatea/ Romeo and Juliet/ Hamlet (Jun 1888)
- The Merchant of Venice/ Twelfth Night (July 1988) – Newcastle
- Pygmalion and Galatea (Aug 1888) – Adelaide
- The Merchant of Venice/Much Ado About Nothing/Pygmalion and Galatea/Romeo and Juliet/Cymbeline (Aug-Oct 1888) – Melbourne

=== George Darrell Company and Others ===
- The Sunny South (Jan 1889) – New Zealand tour
- The Sunny South /Barnes of New York by George Darrell/ Huế and Cry by George Darrell (May 1889) – Newcastle – Rolfe later filmed this
- Othello (Sep 1889) – Melbourne – George Miln Company
- Eileen Ogre/Arrah-na-Pogue (June 1890) – Adelaide – Grattan Riggs Company

=== Alfred Dampier Company ===
- Robbery Under Arms/Monte Cristo/The Flying Dutchman/The Workman/The Lyons Courier/Jess (Sept 1890 – April 1891) – Melbourne
- The Count of Monte Cristo (Sept 1891) – Broken Hill
- Faust/Romeo and Juliet/ Wilful Murder (April–May 1892) – Melbourne
- Romeo and Juliet (Aug 1892) – Tasmania tour
- The Green Lanes of England (May 1893) – Sydney

=== Maggie Moore Company ===
- Forty Nine (Dec 1894) – Melbourne – with Maggie Moore's company
- Struck Oil/ The Circus Queen by Tom Taylor (Feb 1895) – Theatre Royal, Adelaide – March 1895 Broken Hill

=== W. Elton Company ===
- The Guv'nor/ She Stoops to Conquer/ The Flying Scud (May 1895) – Adelaide with Lily Dampier

=== Alfred Dampier Company ===
- Robbery Under Arms/ For the Term of His Natural Life/ The Green Lanes of England/ The Royal Pardon (Nov 1895) – His Majesty's, Sydney – December went to Newcastle where Rolfe was stage manager
- To the West by Dampier and Kenneth Mackay/ Monte Cristo (February, 1896) – Sydney, Her Majesty's Theatre
- To the West/ A Transvaal Heroine (April, 1896) – Bendigo
- Monte Cristo/ The Green Lanes of England/ Robbery Under Arms/ A Transvaal Heroine/ To the West (Jun-Aug 1896) – Queensland tour
- A Transvaal Heroine (Sept 1896) – Maitland
- Robbery Under Arms/Monte Cristo/ Thou Shalt Not Steal by Dampier (Oct-Dec 1896) – Alexandra Theatre, Melbourne – Rolfe was stage manager
- Robbery Under Arms/ A Transvaal Heroine/ Monte Cristo/ Thou Shalt Not Steal/ Camille/ It's Never Too Late to Mend/The Green Lanes of England/ Dr Jekyll and Mr Hyde/ The New Magdalen by Wilkie Collins (Dec 1896-Jan 1897) – Tasmania Tour
- Robbery Under Arms/ Monte Cristo/ It's Never Too Late to Mend/ Hamlet (Jan-Feb 1897) – Adelaide
- Robbery Under Arms/ Monte Cristo/ It's Never Too Late to Mend/ Hamlet/ Camille (Feb-March 1897) – Broken Hill
- Monte Cristo/ It's Never Too Late to Mend/ The Green Lanes of England/ Robbery Under Arms/ Hamlet/ East Lynne/ A Royal Pardon (April–June 1897) – West Australia Tour
- Robbery Under Arms/ East Lynne/ Monte Cristo/ A Transvaal Heroine (July-Sept 1897) – NSW tour: Wagga Wagga, Bathurst, Dubbo, Newcastle
- Robbery Under Arms/ Monte Cristo/ The Merchant of Venice (Sept 1897) – Lyceum, Sydney
- East Lynne/ Robbery Under Arms/ Monte Cristo (Oct 1897) – country NSW and Victoria

=== England performances ===
- Human Nature (March–July 1898) – tour of provinces for Drury Lane Syndicate
- Honor Bright by Ronald Grahame and E. T. de Bauzie (Aug-Oct 1898) – Queens Theatre, Longten – with Lily Dampier

=== Alfred Dampier Company ===
- New East Lynne/ The Duchess of Coolgardie/ It's Never Too Late to Mend/ The Three Musketeers/ Robbery Under Arms/ A Royal Pardon/ Every Day London (March–May, 1899) – Adelaide – with Lily – first performance back
- His Natural Life/ The Three Musketeers/ Robbery Under Arms/ East Lynne/ Every Day London (Sept-Oct 1899) – Queensland tour
- Briton and Boer by Adam Pierre/ For the Term of His Natural Life/ The New East Lynne/ Briton and Boer/ Robbery Under Arms/ Merchant of Venice (Dec 1899-Jan 1900) – Theatre Royal, Hobart; Launceston
- Robbery Under Arms/ Briton and Boer/ The Three Musketeers/ The Merchant of Venice/ Hamlet/ East Lynne (Feb-April 1900) – Melbourne
- Robbery Under Arms/ East Lynne/ Briton and Boer/ The Merchant of Venice/ For the Term of His Natural Life/ The Duke's Motto/ The Green Lanes of England/ Hamlet/ The Power of Wealth by W. J. Lincoln/ Drink by Charles Reade/ Macbeth/ The Penalty of Crime by Lewis Gilbert/ All for Gold/ The Black Flag/ Dr Jekyll and Mr Hyde/ The Three Musketeers/ A Royal Pardon/ Monte Cristo/ The Bush King/ It's Never Too Late to Mend/ Brought to Justice/ Shamus O'Brien (April 1900-April 1901) – Criterion Theatre, Sydney
- The Power of Wealth/ The Black Flag/ Robbery Under Arms/ Hamlet/ For the Term of His Natural Life/ East Lynne/ MacBeth/ Shamus O'Brien (May–July 1901) – Bijou Theatre, Melbourne
- Robbery Under Arms/ The Merchant of Venice/ For the Term of His Natural Life/ The Bush King/ East Lynne/ Escape from Portland/ (Sept-Nov 1901) – Perth, then Kalgoorlie
- Monte Cristo/Escaped from Portland/Robbery Under Arms/The Bush King/The Merchant of Venice/ Green Lanes of England/ The Power of Wealth/ The Penalty of Crime/ East Lynne/ For the Term of His Natural Life (Dec 1901 to Jan 1902) – Theatre Royal, Hobart
- Robbery Under Arms (Feb 1902) – Geelong
- Robbery Under Arms/ The Bush King/ Monte Cristo/ Strangers of Paris (Aug-Sept 1902) – Newcastle
- The Bush King/ Monte Cristo/ For the Term of His Natural Life/ East Lynne/ The Power of Wealth/ Robbery Under Arms (Oct-Nov 1902) – Brisbane, Townsville
- For the Term of His Natural Life (Dec 1902) – Maitland, Wagga Wagga
- The Bush King/ Robbery Under Arms/ For the Term of His Natural Life/ The Power of Wealth/ The Merchant of Venice/ The Count of Monte Cristo/ East Lynne/ From Clue to Capture/ The Stranglers of Paris/ For the Term of His Natural Life (Dec 1902 – Feb 1903) – Adelaide
- The Bush King/ The Power of Wealth/ The Term of His Natural Life (March 1903) – Broken Hill
- Robbery Under Arms (Sept 1903) – Sydney
- The Bush King/ It's Never too Late to Mend/ Second to None/ Vendetta/ For the Term of His Natural Life/ The Merchant of Venice/ East Lynne/ Monte Cristo/ The Growing of the Rata (a New Zealand set play by Charles Owen and Adam Pierre)/ Green Lanes of England (Nov 1903 – April 1904) – New Zealand
- Second to None/ The Merchant of Venice/ Camille/ It's Never Too Late to Mend/ The Unseen Hand by Adam Pierre/ The Power of Wealth/ The Bush King (June-Sept 1904) – Brisbane and Queensland
- The Bush King/ Robbery Under Arms/ Second to None (Oct-Nov 1904) – Maitland, Bathurst
- The Bush King / It's Never Too Late to Mend/For the Term of His Natural Life/ The Black Flag/ East Lynne/ Robbery Under Arms/ Camille/ The Green Lanes of England (Dec 1904-March 1905) – Adelaide, then Gawler, Port Pirie
- The Bush King/ Robbery Under Arms/ His Natural Life/ East Lynne/ The Postmistress of the Czar (Oct – Dec 1905) – Sydney (Alfred Dampier made a re-appearance after a lengthy illness)
- Robbery Under Arms/ East Lynne/ Camille (Dec 1905-Jan 1906) – Bendigo

=== Replacements ===
- The Power of the Cross (April 1910) – Sydney

=== Philip Lytton Company ===
- The Fatal Wedding/ The Bush King/ Robbery Under Arms/ What Women Suffer/ The Fighting Parson (Aug–Nov 1910) – country tour of towns in New South Wales – left for New Zealand in October
