= The Lady Outlaw =

1911 film

- The Age 28 Aug 1911
- Directed by: Alfred Rolfe
- Starring: Charles Villiers; Alice Emslie
- Production company: Australian Photo-Play Company
- Release date: 28 August 1911
- Running time: 2,500 feet or over 3,000 feet
- Country: Australia
- Languages: Silent; English intertitles

The Lady Outlaw is a 1911 Australian silent film set in Van Diemen's Land during convict days.

It was also known as By His Excellency's Command or By His Excellency's Command, a Tale of a Lady Outlaw.

It is considered a lost film.

The film was from the Australian Photoplay Company.

== Plot ==
In the 1860s, Dorothy's lover is transported to Hobart for committing a crime. She follows him there only to discover he has been assigned as a servant to a villainous land owner and has escaped to the hills, where police believe he has died.

Dorothy decides to seek revenge and leads a group of escape convicts on raids on the land owner's house. She then discovers her lover is alive and married to another woman. She decides to remain a bushranger until she gets involved in a shoot out by the sea.

After a duel between a lieutenant and her last surviving follower, she is captured by police.

The chapter headings were:

- Arrested-for Forgery
- Transported for Life
- A Woman's Devotion
- Lieutenant Dashwood escapes
- Struggle on the Cliffs
- Dashed to Death
- A Bid-for Freedom
- A Free Pardon

== Cast ==
- Charles Villiers
- Alice Emslie

== Production ==
The film was shot in New South Wales and featured a bushfire scene.

It starred Alice Emslie, a champion horsewoman, in the lead role.

== Release ==
The film was previewed in Melbourne in August 1911.

The Hobart Mercury reported that "the picture is described as one of the finest yet shown in Hobart, and the novelty of the subject should bo the means of drawing large houses."

The Bulletin said the film ""interests me rather more than any other" and claimed it was meant to be based on John Batman:

There is a tradition that Batman married a woman outlaw, whom he captured in Tasmania... Can anybody explain how the outlaw legend arose? Surely it must be legend! According to the biograph, excellently got up in Sydney by Rolfe, so long associated with Dampier, the lady was of good family in England. Her lover was transported, and went through some Rufus Dawes kind of experiences in Tasmania. She went there to seek him, and was informed that he had died through the cruelty of Elton, his employer. Thereupon she takes to bushranging, as leader of a convict gang, and is just going to shoot Elton when she finds that her lover is alive, and with a wife. More agony! Here Batman comes in, under the name of Dashwood, and, after a desperate chase, captures her. Of course, it winds up with the customary cuddle of the biograph. But I don’t believe a flick of it.
