= The Miner's Curse =

The Miner's Curse, or the Bush Wedding
- Directed by: Alfred Rolfe
- Production company: Australian Photo-Play Company
- Release date: 27 November 1911
- Running time: 3,000 feet
- Country: Australia
- Languages: Silent film English intertitles

The Miner's Curse, or the Bush Wedding is a 1911 Australian silent film directed by Alfred Rolfe set during the Australian Gold Rush.

It is considered a lost film.

== Plot ==
Sam Flood, a gambler in a small Western mining town, is in love with May, the daughter of Harper, who runs the local pub. However, May is in love with a handsome young miner named Dick Taylor.

Flood induces Dick to play a game of poker, and while the game is proceeding, Dick sees Flood slip four cards up his sleeve. Dick immediately rises and calls Flood a cheat; the latter draws a revolver and points it at Dick. A fight ensues; the revolver goes off, but nobody is hurt, and at last Dick secures the weapon, calmly takes the cartridges out, and returns it to Flood. Dick then challenges Flood to fight him. Flood accepts and they go outside, where Dick punches out Flood. Tess Jones, who loves Flood, tries to cheer him up but he hits her.

A few days later Flood follows May into the bush and attempts to kiss her, but Dick has followed, and Flood is forced to flee.

Flood and three accomplices arrange to stick up a gold escort, and their plan is overheard by May and her little brother Jack. The men see May and seize her, but Jack hides behind a tree and isn't discovered. They take May with them, and after they are gone, Jack comes out from his hiding place and runs home, where he tells his parents and the miners what has happened.

The miners, led by Dick, start out in pursuit. May is tied to a tree and left there while Flood and his party leave for the location where they plan to attack the escort.

A tree is felled across the track, and the men await the arrival of the escort. A mounted trooper appears and rides up to the tree and dismounts. As he does so, Flood hits him over the head, stunning him, then drags him into the bush.

They are just in time, for the coach comes swinging around a bend, the driver pulling up as he gets to the fallen tree. Flood and his companions open fire, two troopers fall, and the others surrender. The robbers overturn the coach and drive the horses into the bush.

While getting out the gold boxes and mail bags, Dick and the miners ride up, firing a volley as they do so, and the men, with the exception of Flood, are captured. Flood slips away in the excitement, returning to where his horse was left. He makes his escape, although the miners are close behind.

A week later Dick and May are to be married. In the meantime Flood, who has evaded capture, returns to the township to have revenge on Dick, although Tess tries to dissuade him.

The wedding day arrives, and as per Dick's wish they are married in the bush. The minister has just made them one, when Flood rushes in, revolver in hand. Just as he fires, Tess steps forward and receives the bullet meant for Dick. The miners seize Flood and nearly tear him to pieces before handing him over to the police.

== Reception ==
A contemporary critic called it "a powerful drama taken from the early days of Australian gold mining" which "supplies plenty of excitement and sensation and it possesses a good moral lesson."
