= Independent Natural Resources, Inc =

Independent Natural Resources, Inc. or INRI is an American IP holding company based in Eden Prairie, Minnesota. It formed Renew Blue in Dallas as a wholly owned subsidiary charged with licensing the SEADOG pump.

The SEADOG Pump is an ocean-wave energy technology patented by Independent Natural Resources Inc. (INRI) and invented by Kenneth W. Welch, Jr. The pump rises and falls with ocean swells, effectively capturing the energy in the ocean waves, to pump seawater to a land-based elevated holding tank. Once in the tank, the potential energy of the water can be used to drive hydroelectric generators, to generate electricity or desalinate water.

The technology was tested in the Gulf of Mexico with results validated by Texas A&M University at Galveston. The SEADOG Pump's manufacturer estimates that "a square-mile field of pumps could generate 50 to 1,500 megawatts of electricity – depending on the size and frequency of waves."

The company's technology has been shown in energy conferences, including the Gulf Coast Innovation Conference & Showcase and the Energy and Clean Technology Venture Forum. It has had features in the Star Tribune, the Houston Business Journal, the Houston Chronicle and Popular Mechanics.

INRI ceased operations in 2010 and gone through bankruptcy and liquidation.

== See also ==
- Texas Natural Resources, LLC
