= Call of the Bush =

- Written by: Jack Allen
- Starring: Charles Woods "Mr Barrington"
- Production company: Australian Photoplay Company or Gaumont Federal Films
- Release date: 16 December 1912
- Running time: 2,000 feet or 2,500 feet
- Country: Australia
- Languages: Silent film English intertitles

Call of the Bush is a 1912 Australian silent film. It is considered a lost film.

== Plot ==
The film was billed as "a story of the Australian bush, based on the incidents of the easy miner settlements."

The home of Wm Collins, a squatter on the Lachlan, was shown, together with the return Fred, who had won his V.C. in the recent Boer war. Fred was secretly loved by Mary Campbell, but lost his heart to the shepherd's pretty daughter to whom he presented his dog Ruby. Bill Doyle, a stockman, was also infatuated with this girl and swore that if he could not have her Fred Collins would not. Through Bill's actions, Fred was sent away from home because of his alleged unfaithfulness to Mary Cameron, but was brought back when the latter declared that he had never had sex with her. Young Cameron was killed by Doyle on the journey and the latter left Fred's riding whip under the body so that the crime might be fixed upon him. Fred, in due course was arrested and tried, but at this critical moment a sundowner who has witnessed the murder turned up and gave evidence, at the same time producing a handkerchief bearing the name of Doyle. Fred was released and married and married the shepherd's daughter while Doyle went to the scaffold. The sundowner, though offered a home with the happy young couple, could not remains in conventional quarters so responded again to the call of the bush.

It was divided into the following chapters:

- the squatter's son
- a welcome home
- the shepherd's daughter
- Bosun, the dog hero
- attacked by blacks
- the last cartridge
- a foul revenge
- wrongly accused
- a sundowner to the rescue
- great court scene.

== Production ==
This was the first film made in Australian by the Gaumont Company, trading as "The Gaumont Agency". Other sources however say it was some the Australian Photoplay Company – who were bought out by Gaumont. Another says it was from "Gaumont Federal Films", an amalgamation of Gaumont and APPC.

The script was written by Jack Allen of Wollongong.

It was shot on location on a New South Wales station.

The Gaumont Agency later also made The Opium Runners.
