= Charles Woods (filmmaker) =

Australian filmmaker

Charles Woods was an Australian comedian and filmmaker from the silent era. He would occasionally accompany screenings of films he had directed and give lectures.

He worked extensively on stage as an actor and in 1922 formed his own dramatic company to present plays.

== Select Film Credits ==
- The Assigned Servant (1911) – film – actor
- Cooee and the Echo (1912) – film – actor
- Call of the Bush (1912) – film – actor
- The Bondage of the Bush (1913) – film – actor, director, writer
- A Coo-ee from Home (1918) – film – director
