= The Hero of the Dardanelles =

- Still from film
- Directed by: Alfred Rolfe
- Written by: Phillip Gell; Loris Brown
- Starring: Guy Hastings; Loma Rossmore
- Production company: Australasian Films
- Release date: 17 July 1915
- Running time: 59 minutes (4,000 feet)
- Country: Australia
- Language: English

The Hero of the Dardanelles is a 1915 Australian film directed by Alfred Rolfe, made as a patriotic war recruiting film.

== Plot ==
Will Brown (Guy Hastings) enlists in the Australian Army after the outbreak of World War I. He goes through training at Liverpool, near Sydney, and encourages other men to join up, putting up a recruiting poster. A pacifist tears the poster down but Will sees him off. Before leaving Australia, he proposes to Lily Branton (Loma Rossmore).

Arriving in Egypt, Will is stationed at Mena camp near the Great Pyramid at Giza, and trains with the other troops. They then move to Gallipoli, where Will takes part in the first wave ashore on 25 April 1915. He fights a Turkish sniper hand to hand and drowns him. He returns home wounded and marries Lily. The film ends with a call for Australian men to enlist.

== Cast ==
- Guy Hastings as William Brown
- Loma Rossmore as Lily Brunton
- C. Throoby as Mr. Brown
- Ruth Wainwright as Mrs. Brown
- Fred Francis as Gordon Brown

== Production ==
The Sun 18 July 1915

The movie was the first feature from Australasian Films since 1912, although they had made newsreels and short films during that time. It was a sequel to Will they Never Come? (1915), using many of the same cast and crew. It too was made with the co-operation of the Department of Defence.

The film was written by the same team who had done Will They Never Come?. Co-writer Phil Gell allegedly wanted to enlist but was asked not to until he had written this film.

Some commentators believe Australasian Films were partly motivated to make the movie to ensure government protection of the film industry during the war.

The landing at Gallipoli was restaged with one thousand real troops from Liverpool Camp at Tamarama Beach in Sydney.

Lead actor Guy Hastings was at the time best known for appearing on stage in Bert Bailey's production of On Our Selection.

The original film ran for approximately 4,000 feet (59 minutes at 18 frames per second), but only 21 minutes survives.

== Reception ==
The film was very popular at the box office and was screened to the Prime Minister and Premier of Victoria. A copy was placed in the archives of Federal Parliament. It was used as a recruiting tool, taken around the country by members of the armed forces for special screenings.

Footage from the film was later used in the movie The Spirit of Gallipoli (1928).
