= What Happened to Jean =

- Directed by: Herbert Walsh
- Written by: Keith Yelland
- Starring: Edith Crowe
- Cinematography: Harry Krischock
- Production company: Trench Comforts Fund Committee
- Release date: 7 November 1918
- Running time: 5,000 feet
- Country: Australia
- Languages: Silent film; English intertitles
- Box office: £2,000

What Happened to Jean is a 1918 Australian silent film shot in South Australia. It is a lost film.

== Plot ==
Country girl Jean sets out to see the world. She arrives in Adelaide, runs into villainous Ashbourne, and wins a car in a competition conducted by the Trench Comfort Fund. She meets a socialite called Mrs de Tafford, who misses her long-lost daughter. Mrs de Tafford adopts Jean and promotes her in society. Jean attends a garden party and government house and is sent to a boarding school to complete her education. She discovers that she is in fact Mrs de Tafford's long-lost daughter.

== Cast ==
- Edith Crowe as Jean
- Mrs Ernest Good as Mrs. de Tafford
- Price Weir as Colonel de Tafford
- Herbert Walsh as Reg Stanton
- James Anderson as Dad Smith
- Ethelwyn Robin as Mum Smith
- Janet Ward as Stella
- Rita Crowe as Maid
- Victor Fitzherbert as Ashbourne
- Roth Martin as George
- Hartley Williams as Jasper
- Harold Rivaz as Jabez
- Darcy Kelway as Bertie

Many members of Adelaide society also appeared, including South Australia's Premier Peake.

== Production ==
The film was made by the South Australian Trench Comforts Fund to raise money for charity. It was intended for South Australian audiences only and deliberately featured many local landmarks. Most of the cast and crew were amateurs.

== Reception ==
The film was hyped through a series of ads in Adelaide papers simply asking "what happened to Jean?" It received a gala premiere, attended by the Premier, Governor General, and leading members of Adelaide society.

The film was well received in Adelaide and raised a reported £2,000.
