= The Love Tyrant =

- Directed by: Alfred Rolfe
- Starring: Charles Villiers
- Production company: Australian Photo-Play Company
- Release date: 6 April 1912
- Running time: 1,800 feet or 2,200 feet
- Country: Australia
- Languages: Silent film English intertitles

The Love Tyrant is a 1912 Australian silent film directed by Alfred Rolfe. It was described as an "Australian drama about the back blocks" and a "stirring drama full of thrilling incidents". It was set during the early bushranging days.

It is a lost film.

The film was also known as 'Love the Tyrant.

== Plot ==
The story begins on Christmas Day at Farmer Morrison's home. Morrison's son, William, has been secretly married to Annie, the maid. Morrison wishes his son to marry Dora. When William tells him the truth, he kicks out his son and wife.

Time passes and William owns a farm and has a son with Annie. On returning' one-night from his work, tired and hungry, he has a dispute with his wife, who threatens to leave. Troubled and worn out, he falls a sleep and dreams a dream in which he imagines his wife has left him for another man.

A mail robbery occurs in the district and William and three stockmen are falsely accused. After his trial, he returns to find his stock ruined. He runs away to the bush and becomes an outlaw. He is sentenced to death and as he is placed on the scaffold he wakes up to find his wife at his side. He becomes reconciled to his father who proved the enemy of his dream.

== Released ==
The movie was selected to open the new Glenferrie Theatre in Melbourne. In Sydney and Adelaide it was screened as Love, the Tyrant.
