= King of the Coiners =

- Based on: play Under Remand by Eric Hudson and Reginald Stockton
- Starring: Charles Villers
- Production company: Australian Photo-Play Company
- Release date: 8 January 1912
- Running time: 2,500 feet
- Country: Australia
- Languages: Silent film English intertitles

King of the Coiners is a 1912 Australian silent film directed by Alfred Rolfe. It is considered a lost film.

== Plot ==
The plot consists of two acts and 61 scenes. Luke Holt is a police sergeant who doubles as the head of a gang of counterfeiters under the name of Jean Leroy. He tries to recruit a young engraver, Ned Truman, into the gang but he is too honest. Holt then frames him by getting Biddy Higgins to place counterfeit coins in Truman's room. The young man is sent to gaol and his wife Nellie suffers great hardship.

A detective, Ben Burleigh, investigates and uncovers Holt's guilt. Holt tries to escape in a fast car but it cashes over a cliff and he is killed.

Chapter headings were:

- the false accusation;
- turned into the streets;
- the coiner's den
- Wooloomooloo;
- starving in the Domain;
- a woman's courage;
- hurled to destruction;
- a dash for liberty;
- The murder in Centennial Park;
- escape in motor-car;
- over the cliffs;
- face to face with death.

== Cast ==
- Charles Villiers

== Original Play ==
Under Remand
- Written by: Eric Hudson; Reginald Stockton
- Original language: English
- Genre: Melodrama

Premiere
- Date premiered: 1894

The movie was based on an 1894 play entitled Under Remand which had been staged most recently in Australia in 1907 with Godfrey Cass.

It has no connection with another play called King of Coiners despite being also about counterfeiters.

== Production ==
The motor smash was shot at Bondi cliffs.

== Reception ==
Charles Villiers, who appeared in the cast, would accompany the film and give lectures.

The Advertiser said that "the subject is of an exceedingly interesting character, and a prominent feature is a motor car smash."
