= The Moira, or Mystery of the Bush =

Moira, or The Mystery of the Bush
- Directed by: Alfred Rolfe
- Starring: Charles Villers
- Cinematography: A. O. Segerberg
- Production company: Australian Photo-Play Company
- Distributed by: Gaumont Company
- Release date: 9 September 1912
- Running time: 3,000 feet
- Country: Australia
- Languages: Silent film English intertitles

Moira, or The Mystery of the Bush is a 1912 Australian silent film directed by Alfred Rolfe.

It is considered a lost film.

It may also be known as Call of the Bush.

Charles Woods appeared as a lecturer accompanying the film.

== Plot ==
Some aboriginals steal a child in rural Australia. Fifteen years later the father of the girl discovers her although he does not know who she is at first. Eventually the two are reunited.

Chapter headings:

- blacks attack the camp
- murder
- kidnapped
- given up for dead
- beautiful white girl in the bush
- escape in the canoe
- Moira at the mining camp
- Ralph's return to Sydney
- meets with accident at Darling Point Road
- father and reunited

== Cast ==
- Charles Villiers
