= Only a Factory Girl =

- Distributed by: Pathe Company
- Release date: 14 August 1911 (Sydney)
- Country: Australia
- Languages: Silent film English intertitles

Only a Factory Girl is a 1911 Australian film. Very little is known about it and it is considered a lost film.

It premiered at the Victoria Theatre in Sydney, then under the direction of Frank Musgrove, in August 1911. It was called "one of the most sentimental and strongest picture dramas yet produced at this continuous picture house." The movie was followed on the schedule by another Australian film The Sundowner.

The film also screened in Newcastle and Adelaide.

== Premise ==
According to the Daily Telegraph "it is the story of the love of the son of a millionaire factory owner for a girl who works in the factory, and the girl's devotion to her lover in the latter's trouble. This devotion changes the millionaire's contempt for the girl into admiration, and he consents to their marriage."
