= The Cheat (1912 film) =

- Directed by: Alfred Rolfe
- Produced by: Stanley Crick; Herbert Finlay
- Starring: Charles Villiers
- Production company: Australian Photo-Play Company
- Release date: 29 April 1912
- Running time: over 3,000 feet
- Country: Australia
- Languages: Silent film English intertitles

The Cheat is a 1912 Australian silent film directed by Alfred Rolfe. It is considered a lost film.

== Synopsis ==
An Englishman is wrongly accused of a crime and flees to Australia. On the boat over he saves the life of a squatter's daughter when she falls overboard. In gratitude, the girl's father gives him a job on his station. The Englishman falls in love with the girl and they get engaged to be married. However he faces opposition from the station manager, who causes trouble for them. The climax involves a bushfire and "ride for life".

== Cast ==
- Ethel Phillip
- Stanley Walpole
- Charles Villiers

== Release ==
The movie advertised the film as "teaming with sensational incidents and told in the picturesque surroundings of the Australian Bush."

According to the Adelaide Register "it is a particularly interesting film, the spectator with any sense of emotion is worked up to a high pitch of enthusiasm as the subject is being screened."
