= Whose Was the Hand? =

- Sun 16 June 1912
- Directed by: Alfred Rolfe
- Starring: Charles Villiers
- Cinematography: A. O. Segerberg
- Production company: Australian Photo-Play Company
- Release dates: 25 June 1912 (Sydney); 4 July 1912 (Melbourne)
- Running time: 3,000 feet (over 60 mins)
- Country: Australia
- Languages: Silent film English intertitles

Whose Was the Hand? is a 1912 Australian silent film directed by Alfred Rolfe. It is considered a lost film.

== Plot ==
A young man is heavily in debt and decides to get out of it by robbing his uncle. He does this with a criminal accomplice. During the course of the robbery, the uncle enters and fights with the nephew. The nephew kills his uncle and wipes his blood stained hands on the panel of the door.

The uncle's secretary is first on the scene and is arrested. However fingerprints of the blood stained hands do not match. Detective Sharp investigates further, leading him to the nephew, whose finger prints do match. The film ends with the rescue of the murdered man's daughter from a burning building, and the arrest of the murderer's accomplices.

An important scene involves a burning building where a lady is rescued.

The chapter headings were:

- the ne'er-d-well
- the forgery
- the attempted robbery
- the murder mystery
- the hand on the wall
- wrongly accused
- a clue, a confession
- the fight on the roof
- alarm of fire
- dashed to death.

== Production ==
The film was shot in Sydney.

== Reception ==
One critic said "the production was one of exceptional excellence. For clever acting, extensive staging, daring effects and quality of photography, the film stands as a masterpiece."
