= Lily Dampier =

Australian actress

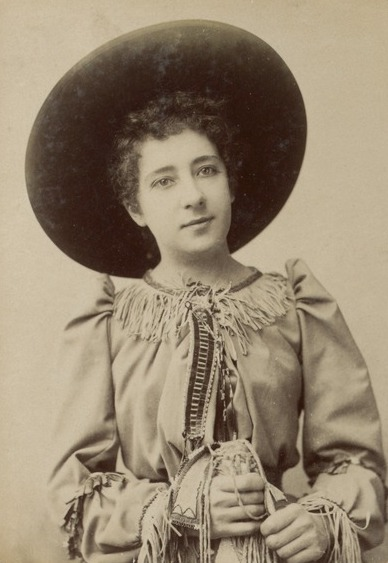
Lily Dampier from Photograph album compiled c. 1870–1900. Collection, State Library Victoria (Australia) MS6135

Katherine Annabel Lily Dampier (1867 or 1868 – 6 February 1915), (Note: One reference gives her date of birth as January 1859 problematical given her father's year of birth 1843~47 and her (presumed) mother born c. 1848. January 1869 is quite plausible.) known as Lily Dampier, was an Australian actress of stage and screen. She was the daughter of Alfred Dampier and married to Alfred Rolfe.

Her best known stage parts were Sylvia in For the Term of His Natural Life and Kate in Robbery Under Arms. She also performed many roles from Shakespeare and worked in England.

A contemporary described her as a better actress than her sister Rose:

Certainly she was the more forceful, physically, and vocally, but she was disqualified for high tragic roles by the fact that she had ridiculously small feet for a well developed woman, and used to walk in mincing and tottering steps in moments when rhythmic striding was needed.

She married actor/architect William Watkins, stage name Watkin Wynne, on 19 September 1889, divorced 1892. He was a member of her father's company of actors. She married Rolfe in 1893.

== Death ==
Lily was staying in William Street, West Melbourne when she took ill. Her husband was filming in Sydney and was going to take her to a private hospital when she died. According to contemporary reports, "her death occurred rather suddenly". Her mother (stage name Katherine Russell) died shortly after, and her sister Rose also died young.

== Select filmography ==
- Captain Midnight, the Bush King (1911)
- Captain Starlight, or Gentleman of the Road (1911)
- The Life of Rufus Dawes (1911)
