= Cooee and the Echo =

- Directed by: Alfred Rolfe
- Starring: Charles Villiers
- Cinematography: A. O. Segerberg
- Production company: Australian Photo-Play Company
- Release date: 11 March 1912
- Running time: 3,000 feet
- Country: Australia
- Languages: Silent film English intertitles

Cooee and the Echo is a 1912 Australian silent film directed by Alfred Rolfe. It is considered a lost film.

== Plot ==
In northern Queensland, a young miner is determined to avenge the murder of his brother by another miner. He falls in love with the daughter of the mine manager but discovers she is being pursued also by his brother's killer. The climax involves a knife fight involving the hero, and the hero's aboriginal friend, Yacka (Charles Woods), coming to the rescue. Another highlight was a scene with a person on horseback jumping off a bridge into the water.

== Cast ==
- Ethel Phillips
- Stanley Walpole
- Charles Villiers
- Charles Woods as Yacka
- Faithful Geebung

== Production ==
Edward William O'Sullivan wrote a play called Cooee, or Wild Days in the Australian Bush but it appears to have a very different plot.

The film was shot near Sydney with bush scenes in the National Park. It was the first feature film definitely known to be shot by A. O. Segerberg.

== Reception ==
One critic said of the film that "the bush in all its picturesqueness and grandeur was brought vividly to the eyes with astounding clearness and fidelity as to details."

The film was a financial success.
