= Captain Midnight, the Bush King =

1911 film

- Screen shot from film
- Based on: The Bush King by W. J. Lincoln and Alfred Dampier
- Produced by: Cosens Spencer; Alan J. Williamson
- Starring: Alfred Rolfe; Lily Dampier; Raymond Longford
- Cinematography: Ernest Higgins
- Edited by: Ernest Higgins
- Distributed by: E. J. Carroll (Qld); Lennon, Hyman & Lennon (Sth Aust); Jury's Pictures (UK); Sawyers Inc (USA)
- Release date: 9 February 1911
- Running time: 2,000 feet
- Country: Australia
- Languages: Silent; English intertitles
- Budget: £800

Captain Midnight, the Bush King (US: The Bushranger's Bride) is a 1911 Australian silent Western film about the fictitious bushranger Captain Midnight. It was the directorial debut of actor Alfred Rolfe. The film is based on the play of same name by W. J. Lincoln and Alfred Dampier. Captain Midnight, the Bush King is now considered lost.

== Synopsis ==
Edgar Dalimore is the son of wealthy station owner Cecil Dalimore, who is persuaded to disinherit his son on false grounds by Cecil's villainous nephew Vincent Lennox. Lennox and an associate, John Stirling, rob a safe belonging to Cecil, resulting in the latter's death. Edgar is wrongfully accused of the murder and is given a life sentence. He escapes with the help of Ned Harling, a bushman who worked for his father, and Ned's daughter Elsa, who loves Edgar.

Despite Elsa's affections, Edgar is in love with squatter's daughter Thelma Warren. A jealous Elsa betrays him to the police, but then changes her mind and helps him escape. Elsa comes forward with evidence that he did not kill his father. The killers try to kill Elsa but Edgar rescues her. Edgar's name is cleared. Elsa is left "lonely and forsaken, finding consolation in the sympathy of her faithful horse."

Still from film

The movie was broken into the following sections:

- The Quarrel between Edgar Dalmore and his Father.
- The Murder of Edgar's Father.
- The Accusation – Edgar accused of the crime, and his committal.
- The Escape – Escaping from prison, he joins Hellville's Gang as Captain Midnight.
- The Attack on the Gold Escort, and Midnight pursued by police.
- The Diplomat – Elsa draws them off the track, and her daring ride.
- The Jealousy – Elsa's jealousy forces her to betray Midnight.
- The Dive for Life – Midnight's pluck and success.
- The Dead Man's Gully – Elsa's terrible fight for life.
- The Rescue – Midnight ever gallant.
- The Justice – The murderer of old Dalmore brought to justice.
- The Innocent – Midnight made a free man.
- The Fate of Captain Midight

== Cast ==
- Alfred Rolfe as Edgar Dalimore/Captain Midnight
- Lily Dampier as Elsa
- Raymond Longford
- Lottie Lyell

== Original play ==
The Bush King
- Poster from 1902 Hobart performance
- Written by: W. J. Lincoln; Alfred Dampier
- Original language: English
- Genre: Bushranger melodrama

Premiere
- Date premiered: 6 November 1893 (Lincoln version); 26 January 1901 (Dampier version)
- Place premiered: Surrey Theatre, London (Lincoln version); Criterion Theatre, Sydney (Dampier version)

=== W. J. Lincoln version ===
The film was adapted from The Bush King, a play originally written by W. J. Lincoln.

The play was about Roger Dalmore, a young English officer who argues with his father, a Cornish mine owner, then emigrates to Australia, where he discovers he is charged with murdering and robbing his father. Although the real culprit is his cousin, Dalmore flees to the bush, where he is rescued by cattle-stealing bushrangers and, due in part of his military experience, becomes their leader under the name Captain Dart.

Dart falls in love with a banker's daughter and another lady falls for him; the latter attempts to betray him to the police after she realises Dart does not love her, however the bushranger escapes. The cousin comes to Australia and becomes involved in defrauding investors in a worthless mine. The cousin plans to blow up the mine but is foiled by Dart who gets him to eventually confesses his crime. He is united with the captain's daughter.

The play debuted in London and over five months it played at three London theatres. "The whole thing is a libel on Australian life as it is", complained one critic. When Lincoln returned to Australia the play then ran in Melbourne for a week in 1894.

Lincoln did some further revisions and the play had a brief run at the Novelty Theatre in London in 1897.

=== Alfred Dampier version ===
The play was rewritten by Alfred Dampier, Rolfe's father in law, writing as "Adam Pierre". He set the play entirely in Australia, changed the hero from being the son of a Cornish mine owner to the son of a wealthy Australian station owner, added a fifth act, renamed the hero Captain Midnight instead of Captain Dart, and added a role for himself as an old bushman, Ned Harling (In the original Harling was a publican but only in a small part). The play ends with Edgar marrying Thelma, leaving Elsa alone.

The play premiered in Sydney on 26 January 1901. It was very popular and was frequently performed throughout the 1900s.

== Production ==
Lottie Lyell and Raymond Longford appeared in the movie as second leads. According to contemporary reports, the actors researched their roles for seven months – this may be a reference to the amount of time they had played the parts on stage.

Cosens Spencer hired Englishman Alan J. Williamson to oversee production. Williamson later said that the script only came to half a dozen pages and was carefully written to not have any interior scenes as there were no studio facilities at the time. Shooting took place in the Sydney suburbs of Narrabeen and Frenchs Forest, as well as in the Blue Mountains, with an average of five or six scenes being filmed a day. Williamson claimed occasionally reshoots were needed but the actors were unavailable because of theatrical commitments, so they would just write a title to cover it. The budget was originally £300 but went up to £800.

Alan Williamson during filming

Williamson said that Raymond Longford also worked as his assistant and was a "tower of strength" throughout the shoot.

The scene of Captain Midnight leaping off a cliff on horseback into a river and swimming away admit a hail of bullets was well received and "soon became obligatory for bushrangers in Australian cinema folklore." It has been suggested this scene was inspired by a similar moment in Alfred Dampier's 1891 Wild West drama The Scout.

Some lines of verse by Joseph L Goodman appeared on screen.

== Release ==
Still from film

It was a critical and popular success – Williamson claimed the film recouped its budget from one cinema alone. One critic wrote that:

There is hardly a moment but is associated with some exciting incident, and the audience last night followed the picture with repeated bursts of cheering and applause, which found echo in the unrestrained appreciation manifest at its termination. Sensational horsemanship and thrilling adventure have been woven into a plot plausible in its entirety and of absorb ing interest.

The Sydney Morning Herald declared it:

A splendid series of bushranging incidents... It might be wished that Australian reproductions of melodramatic subjects were less frequently identified with the murderous doings of ruffians whitewashed but being in such demand Captain Midnight will be recognized as a cleverly contrived example of its class. Miss Lily Dampier and Mr Alfred Rolfe figured to much advantage... a long series of beautiful bush spaces... gave realism and distinction to the story.

Cosens Spencer would later make three other films based on Alfred Dampier play adaptations of novels set in colonial Australia, Captain Starlight, or Gentleman of the Road (1911), The Life of Rufus Dawes (1911) and The Romantic Story of Margaret Catchpole (1912). The first two were directed by Alfred Rolfe, but the third was made by Raymond Longford, whose early career was sponsored by Spencer.

=== UK & USA ===
The movie was released in England via Jury's Pictures, where it received enthusiastic reviews.

The film was one of a number of Spencer movies bought for release in the US by Sawyer Inc. in 1913. It was retitled The Bushranger's Bride.

== Remake ==
A copy of a script adapted from the play by Rolfe is available at the National Archives of Australia dated 1920. This script does not have the main character turn bushranger. It is likely it is a script for a proposed remake, considering the ban on bushranger films that had been in force in New South Wales since 1912.
