= What Women Suffer =

- Directed by: Alfred Rolfe
- Based on: play by H. G. Brandon
- Starring: Alfred Rolfe
- Production company: Australian Photo-Play Company
- Release date: 2 October 1911 (Melbourne)
- Running time: 4,000 feet
- Country: Australia
- Languages: Silent film English intertitles

What Women Suffer is a 1911 Australian silent film directed by Alfred Rolfe. It is a Victorian melodrama, complete with a climax where a little child is placed on a moving saw bench and is considered a lost film.

== Plot ==
In England, Edith Norton is married to a dashing naval officer, Lt Coventry, who bears a resemblance to Jack Baxter, a common thief. Edith's father is killed by Baxter and Coventry is framed for this by the evil Herbert Standish who has designs on Edith. Partly convicted on the testimony of his son, Cedric, Coventry is thrown in prison.

Years earlier Standish had abandoned Nance, daughter of the old gardener, Meredith, leaving her to starve. She married Baxter, who gave her a terrible life.

Edith and Cedric are lured to a sawmill by a forged letter from Standish. Standish places the boy on a saw bench and threatens to cut him unless the girl marries her. But Coventry escapes from prison in time to rescue the boy and the girl. Baxter confesses and Coventry and Edith are reunited.

The chapter headings were:

- The return of Lt Coventry
- The fatal resemblance
- The Murder on the Lawn
- Coventry accused of the crime
- His own child convicts him
- The daring escape from the quarry
- The great thrilling sawmill scene
- Out of the jaws of death
- At the point of the revolver
- The confession
- Hunted by the police
- Freedom at last.

== Cast ==
- Alfred Rolfe as Lt Coventry
- Ethel Phillips as Edith
- Stanley Walpole as Standish
- Charles Villiers

== Original Play ==
What Women Suffer
- Original language: English
- Written by: H.G. Brandon
- Genre: Melodrama

The film was based on a popular four-act melodrama which had been produced on the Australian stage by Philip Lytton.

== Production ==
According to contemporary reports the film "was produced at enormous cost solely for the Lyric" Theatre in Melbourne.

== Release ==
The film proved popular with audiences when screened at the two Lyric Theatres in Brunswick and Prahan in Melbourne. It later screened in Sydney, Adelaide and throughout the country. Box office reception was strong.

The Evening News called the film "a triumph in that art of cinematography... the lead parts are well sustained.
