= Sea Dogs of Australia =

- Directed by: Martyn Keith
- Written by: J.S. McCullagh
- Produced by: J.S. McCullagh
- Starring: Charles Villiers
- Production company: Western Pacific Feature Films
- Release date: 12 August 1914
- Running time: 2,500 feet
- Country: Australia
- Languages: Silent film English intertitles

Sea Dogs of Australia is a 1913 Australian silent film about an Australian naval officer blackmailed into helping a foreign spy. The film was publicly released in August 1914, but was almost immediately withdrawn after the Minister for Defence expressed security concerns about footage of the battlecruiser HMAS Australia.

== Plot ==
Lieutenant Verner incurs massive gambling debts, and a foreign spy, Herman Markoff, tries to blackmail him into stealing some secret plans for an explosive. Verner agrees and helps Markoff kidnap his friend, Lieutenant Sidney, but is stopped by Dave Smith, a champion Australian boxer. Verner tries again and by torturing Sidney succeeds in securing the plans. Verner decides to use the plans to blow up the battlecruiser HMAS Australia, but Sidney manages to escape and kill Markoff. Verner almost escapes on a ship, but Australia sinks it and Verner dies.

The chapter headings were:

- sailor ant his ladd
- the shadow of the 12-inch guns
- the new explosive
- the spy
- the stolen plan from the chart room of HMAS Australia
- attempted robbery
- a well known Australian pugilist to the rescue
- kidnapped
- black treachery
- the strange cruiser
- the submarine mine
- the fastest craft in Australian waters
- the chase
- HMAS Australia in action – the 12 inch guns in play
- the destruction of the mysterious warship by the 12 inch guns of HMAS Australia
- the secret safe
- Australia's own.

== Cast ==
- Eric Howell as Lieutenant Verner
- Dave Smith as himself
- Charles Villers

== Production ==
During late 1913, filming occurred aboard Australia.

== Release ==
The film was trade screened in December 1913 but not released commercially until August the following year. It was then withdrawn from screening by order of the Minister for Defence, most likely due to security concerns over footage of Australia.
