= Do Men Love Women? =

- Directed by: Alfred Rolfe
- Starring: Charles Villiers
- Production company: Australian Photo-Play Company
- Release date: 11 January 1912
- Running time: 3,500 feet
- Country: Australia
- Languages: Silent film English intertitles

Do Men Love Women? is a 1912 Australian silent film directed by Alfred Rolfe about an alcoholic who reforms through the love of a good woman. The finale featured a railway collision.

It is a lost film.

== Plot ==
Chapter headings for the film were:

- the dinner party
- the first sign of the inebriate
- the success of the young novelist
- a patient wife
- heartbroken
- the drunkard's action
- the curse of drink
- the love of a woman
- cured
- the nurses' intrigue
- this is our child
- repentance
- the great railway smash
- men do love women.

== Cast ==
- Charles Villiers

== Production ==
The film was shot in Sydney.

== Reception ==
The film seems to have been widely distributed, with the railway collision prominently advertised. Reviews were generally strong. It was described as a "modern East Lynne".

Charles Villiers, who appeared in the cast, would accompany screenings of the film as a lecturer.
