= Charles Villiers (actor) =

Australian actor (1884–1940)

Charles Villiers (1884–1940) was an Australian actor and occasional director who appeared in many silent films. According to a contemporary report, "there is probably no actor in Australia that has done more consistent picture work than Mr. Villiers, both as heavy lead, and director." He was particularly well known for playing villains.

== Life and career ==
Charles Villiers was born in 1884. In 1912, he managed Lytton's Picture Stadium in Orange.

Villiers started working in films for the Australian Photoplay Company for whom he was one of their main actors. He then made a series of films for the Fraser Film Release and Photographic Company.

In 1914 he toured for 12 months with the Oliver Dramatic Company.

Beaumont Smith later estimated Villiers appeared in more than 60 silent films.

Villiers died in 1940. His wife was also an actor.

== Select filmography ==
- Moora Neya, or The Message of the Spear (1911)
- The Lady Outlaw (1911)
- Way Outback (1911)
- What Women Suffer (1911)
- The Cup Winner (1911)
- Caloola, or The Adventures of a Jackeroo (1911)
- King of the Coiners (1912)
- Do Men Love Women? (1912)
- The Sin of a Woman (1912)
- The Crime and the Criminal (1912)
- Cooee and the Echo (1912)
- The Love Tyrant (1912)
- The Cheat (1912)
- Whose Was the Hand? (1912)
- The Moira, or Mystery of the Bush (1912)
- 'Neath Austral Skies (1913)
- Sea Dogs of Australia (1913)
- The Silence of Dean Maitland (1914)
- The Sunny South or The Whirlwind of Fate (1915)
- The Loyal Rebel (1915)
- For Australia (1915)
- Hypocrites (1915)
- The Martyrdom of Nurse Cavell (1916)
- In the Last Stride (1916)
- The Mutiny of the Bounty (1916)
- The Murder of Captain Fryatt (1917)
- Australia's Peril (1917)
- His Convict Bride (1918)
- A Coo-ee from Home (1918)
- Satan in Sydney (1918)
- The Face at the Window (1919) – also directed
- The Man from Kangaroo (1920)
- While the Billy Boils (1921)
- Possum Paddock (1921) – co-directed
- The Lust for Gold (1922)
- A Daughter of Australia (1922)
- When the Kellys Were Out (1923)
- Daughter of the East (1924)
- Sunrise (1926)

== Select theatre credits ==
- The Scarlet Pimpernel (1909)
- The Sign of the Cross (1909)
- The Corsican Brothers (1909)
