= Australian Photo-Play Company =

Australian film production company

The Australian Photo-Play Company was a short-lived but highly productive Australian film production company which operated from 1911 to 1912.

== Establishment ==
Stanley Crick, who was Pathe Freres manager in Australia, and Herbert Finlay had enjoyed success producing a series of Australian films directed by John Gavin.

They decided to establish the Australian Photo-Play Company in June 1911 under the management of Crick with capital of £20,000. (Gavin later claimed it was his idea to form the company.)

It was stated in the initial prospectus the aim of the company was to purchase Crick and Finlay's film manufacturing business.

The initial directors of the company Philip Lytton, Stanley Crick, Dr Sherlock Mason, Arthur Upjohn, and Douglas Selkirk. The company decided to erect two studios for film production – "one capable of producing large spectacular productions, and another smaller interior productions." A studio was built in Summer Hill in Sydney. The company secured the services of A .J. Moulton, A. O. Segerberg, Herbert Finlay and Alfred Rolfe. It was also announced a "second company is at present being formed for the production of well known plays." The company said it "intends to make a specialty of Australian-made good, intending to use only Australian-made articles for the production of Australian films, the camera, printing machines, and developing plant being all locally manufactured."

There were to be two production units, one under Gavin and the other under Alfred Rolfe. Gavin wound up only making one movie for the company, The Mark of the Lash. He later wrote:

I did not favour the idea particularly, as they were introducing two more producers, and I did not think the time was quite ripe for such expansion. As it was, we were all making good money, but the extra people coming in would make the overhead absorb all this; so I pulled out and received a cash price for a parcel of shares, sold out my interest in the four films I had made, and started out on my own as the John F. Gavin Productions.

Gavin claims after he left APP it "made four films, and went into liquidation within twelve months."

Rolfe was extremely prolific. And the company distributed four films that Gavin had made earlier, The Assigned Servant, Keane of Kalgoorlie, Frank Gardiner, and Ben Hall.

By June 1911 the company had distribution outlets in Australian and New Zealand. They produced an advertisement which claimed they were:

The only real live Independent Australian Manufacturers, we make a specialty of the Australian made pictures, we do not run Shows and BOOM OUR OWN PRODUCTION'S whether they be WORTHY OR NOT; but we rely on the trade independently to say whether our goods are good or bad. The popular verdict can only be gauged by the quantity of shows running; our films all over the Commonwealth.

== Growth ==
The first four films made by the company were all different: Moora Neya, The Mark of the Lash, In the Nick of Time and a picture about snake catching in Australia.

In September, 200 shares were offered for sale at £1 each.

By November the company was estimated to employ over forty staff, with a camera department under Herbert Finlay, a laboratory managed by A. O. Segerberg and an acting troupe managed by Rolfe. Their main actors were Charles Villiers, Stanley Walpole and Ethel Phillips. Filming took place on location and at their facilities in Summer Hill, Sydney.

The prime creative force behind the company was Alfred Rolfe, who had extensive stage experience. According to film historians Graham Shirley and Brian Adams:

The conventions of spectacle melodrama so favourited in late nineteenth century Australian theatre, with their realistic settings and real chases on horseback and train wrecks, played a large role in the films he made [for the company]... They were conventions in which his late father-in-law, Alfred Dampier had excelled in his stage productions... The Australian Photo-Play formula was a string of sensational incidents climaxed by a chase, with actuality footage sometimes cunningly incorporated... Nearly all the APP films made use of popular conceptions of the bush, peopling their stories with marauding Aboriginals, vengeful settlers, English outcasts and shamed women. Revenge melodramas were the staple.

Many of the films were based on plays that were popular in Australia at the time. In particular, several had been performed by Philip Lytton prior to filming.

The company were involved in a number of court actions during its existence including one against Lacey Percival.

== Decline ==
The company found it difficult to secure distribution for its movies and never became financially stable.

It wound up production in mid-1912 and was bought out by the local branch of the Gaumont Company, who took over on 25 March. By this stage the company was distributing two films of Gavin's, Keane of Kalgoorlie and Frank Gardiner.

It was eventually absorbed into "the Combine" of Australasian Films and Union Theatres. However, Rolfe, Crick and Finlay all continued their involvement in the film industry.

== Filmography ==
- Moora Neya, or The Message of the Spear (1911)
- The Mark of the Lash (1911) – Gavin's sole film for the company
- Snake Catching in Queensland (1911)
- In the Nick of Time (1911)
- The Lady Outlaw (1911)
- Mates from the Murrumbidgee (1911)
- Way Outback (1911)
- What Women Suffer (1911)
- The Cup Winner (1911)
- Caloola, or The Adventures of a Jackeroo (1911)
- The Miner's Curse (1911)
- Davis Cup Tennis Championship (1912) (documentary)
- By His Excellency's Command (1912)
- King of the Coiners (1912)
- Do Men Love Women? (1912)
- The Sin of a Woman (1912)
- The Crime and the Criminal (1912)
- Cooee and the Echo (1912)
- The Love Tyrant (1912)
- The Cheat (1912)
- Won on the Post (1912)
- Whose Was the Hand? (1912)
- The Moira, or Mystery of the Bush (1912)
- Call of the Bush (1912)
- The Clue of the Lost Handkerchief (1913)

=== Distributed ===
- Ben Hall and his Gang (1911)
- The Assigned Servant (1911)
