= Australasian Films =

Australian film distribution and production company

- Company type: Film distribution and film production company
- Founded: 1913
- Defunct: Merged in Greater Union
- Key people: Directors William Gibson, Cosens Spencer, Stuart F. Doyle

Australasian Films, full name Union Theatres and Australasian Films, was an Australian film distribution and production company formed in 1913 that was wound up in the 1930s to merge into Greater Union. The Union Theatres and Australasian Films dominated cinema in Australia in the 1910s and 1920s.

== Origins ==
In 1912, West's Pictures merged into Amalgamated Pictures, and then Amalgamated Pictures merged with Spencer's Pictures Ltd to create the General Film Company of Australasia. The following year this company combined with the Greater J. D. Williams Amusement Co, a large exhibition and film supply outfit, to create Union Theatres and Australasian Films. The company had a capital of £300,000; its first directors included William Gibson and Cosens Spencer.

== Feature Production ==
Spencer encouraged Australasian to enter feature production with the 1914 silent film The Shepherd of the Southern Cross but the film was not a success at the box office and Spencer was forced out of the company. Thereafter Australasian only produced movies sporadically until the mid-1920s when the company came under the stewardship of Stuart F. Doyle. In 1925 they purchased the Centennial Roller Skating Rink site at 65 Ebley St, Bondi Junction and converted it into a £60,000 film studio. They used it as a skating rink during the night and a studio during the day.

Starting with Painted Daughters in 1925, Australasian produced a number of features, including works from director Raymond Longford. They made five in 12 months, none of which made much impact internationally, so they decided to embark on two major productions, For the Term of His Natural Life (1927) and The Adorable Outcast (1928), both of which featured American stars and director, Norman Dawn Together these movies lost an estimated £30,000. The company soon withdrew from production but in June 1932 it re-emerged as Cinesound Productions.

In 1928, Greater Union is selling off certain assets of Australasian Films to a First National Pictures executive John C. Jones, who formed the new company to Greater Australasian Films. The company entered a contract with major American firm Columbia Pictures later on, and absorbed British Dominions Films.

In 1935, Greater Australasian Films was sold off to Columbia Pictures, effectively folding the company.

F. Stuart Doyle applied many lessons learned from Australasian Films when he established Cinesound Productions.

== Filmography ==
- The Shepherd of the Southern Cross (1914)
- The Loyal Rebel (1915)
- How We Fought the Emden (1915)
- Australia Prepared (1916)
- Cupid Camouflaged (1918)
- Painted Daughters (1925)
- Sunrise (1926)
- The Pioneers (1926)
- Tall Timber (1926)
- Hills of Hate (1926)
- The Grey Glove (1927)
- For the Term of His Natural Life (1927)
- The Adorable Outcast (1928)
- That's Cricket (1931)

== See also ==
- Cinema in Australia
