= Captain Starlight, or Gentleman of the Road =

1911 film

- Directed by: Alfred Rolfe
- Written by: Alfred Rolfe
- Based on: Play by Alfred Dampier & Garnet Walch; Novel by Rolf Boldrewood
- Produced by: Cosens Spencer
- Starring: Alfred Rolfe; Lily Dampier
- Cinematography: Ernest Higgins
- Edited by: Ernest Higgins
- Production company: Spencer's Pictures
- Release date: 16 March 1911
- Running time: 3,500 feet
- Country: Australia
- Languages: Silent; English intertitles

Captain Starlight, or Gentleman of the Road is a 1911 Australian silent film about the bushranger Captain Starlight. It was based on Alfred Dampier's stage adaptation of the 1888 novel Robbery Under Arms. It is considered a lost film.

== Film ==
It is possible to gauge some idea of the plot from contemporary reviews. One critic wrote that "plenty of relief in the way of comedy has been introduced; and whilst there are many grim incidents, these are not allowed to unduly obtrude themselves."

The film starts at the home of the Marston family. Some troopers, led by Sergeant Goring, are looking for Captain Starlight. Goring harasses Aileen Marston when a Mr Beresford appears. Beresford introduces himself as Captain Starlight and tells them to put their hands up. According to a contemporary report, "Sergeant Goring, with both hands in the air, carries the situation off with as much dignity as can be expected, but some of his men fall to the ground in terror."

Starlight and his friends go to the horse races at Turon where Starlight enters his horse Rainbow in the Goldfield Cup under the name Darkie. Starlight encourages all his friends to bet on the horse, but his jockey is found to be too drunk to ride and Starlight has to run the race himself. He wins but is chased off the course by police.

Starlight and his gang, including the vicious Dan Moran, hold up the mail coach at Rocky Rises. Moran robs a pretty young girl but Starlight points his revolver at him and persuades him to hand the young lady back her money. When Starlight discovers that the young lady has no other money apart from that on her possession, he takes her purse and puts a wad of bank notes in it, then restores it to her.

Later Sir Ferdinand Morringer is captured by Moran. He is tied to a tree at Terrible Hollow in order to make him confess where the money to pay the troopers has been concealed. Morringer will not tell so Moran starts beating him. The bushranger is about to kill Morringer when Starlight intervenes, overpowers Moran and sets Morringer free.

Moran is captured by the police. He leads Sergeant Goring and the troopers to Starlight's stronghold. During the final battle, Moran is mortally wounded but Starlight's life is saved by Warrigul, his faithful aboriginal servant who carries him across a river to safety.

Starlight and Dick Marston are subsequently pardoned for their crimes, due in part to the influence of Morringer. This happy ending was in contrast to the novel but consistent with the play adaptation.

Contemporary advertisements listed a synopsis of scenes and events. They were as follows:

- The Home of the Marstons
- Starlight Protects Aileen from Insult
- The Race for the Gold Cup
- The Favourite Wins
- The Rocky Rises
- Sticking up the Mail Coach
- An Awkward Situation
- Sir Ferdinand in a Tight Corner
- Storefield's Homestead
- Moran and His Gang Foiled
- The Burning Stables
- Rescue of the Horses
- Starlight's Last Stand
- Warrigal's Devotion
- The Day of Reckoning and Consolation

According to contemporary reports the character of "Warrigul is always funny-except in the touching scene where, careless of his own life, he brings the wounded Starlight to a place of safety."

== Cast ==
- Alfred Rolfe as Captain Starlight
- Lily Dampier as Eileen Marston
- Raymond Longford
- Augustus Neville
- Lottie Lyell
- Stanley Walpole
- Gilbert Emery as Warragul

According to a contemporary review, "the parts of Sir Ferdinand Morringer and of Sergeant Goring were played by two officials in the police force, who, as most people will agree, would have made their mark at acting had they not taken to the more prosaic business of preserving the peace." Warrigul was played by a white actor.

== Original stage adaptation ==
See Robbery Under Arms (play)

Alfred Rolfe, who later directed the movie, was well versed with the play, having played Sir Ferdinand Morringer in its first production, George Storefield in a revival, and Dick Marston in later productions. In 1893 he married Dampier's daughter Lily, who played Aileen Marston in numerous productions of the play.

== Production ==
It is likely the name of the story was changed from Robbery Under Arms to avoid confusion with the 1907 film version of the novel which was still playing in cinemas.

== Reception ==
It appears the film was a success at the box office, screening in cinemas as late as 1917. The Moving Picture World called it "a brilliant success and record breaker, and highly eulogised by the press and public."

=== Critical response ===
It also received good reviews, the Sunday Times saying "the 'chase scene' through the bush and across a lagoon is very realistic." The Register called it "a thrilling and absorbingly interesting story of Australian bush life, and several daring feats of horsemanship are displayed."

The Sydney Morning Herald stated that "one of the most applauded of the scenes ... was the burning of the stables and the rescue of the horses, Starlight's Last Stand also excited enthusiasm."

The Argus said the film was:

A series of exciting incidents, situations, and escapades... sustained interest throughout and tells the story in a straightforward businesslike way, with a judicious mixture of comedy to relieve it from too great a weight of sensationalism. Much picturesque scenery is introduced, and many fine views of the bush are shown the most notable examples being Terrible Hollow, the Rocky Rises and the localities selected for the sticking up of the mail coach, and Starlight's last stand against the police.

=== US release ===
It was released in the US in 1914 by Sawyers Inc. as The Bandit Terrors of Australia.

== Sources ==
- Fotheringham, Richard, "Introduction", Robbery Under Arms by Alfred Dampier and Garnet Walch, Currency Press 1985
