= 1904 Melbourne Cup =

- Melbourne Cup
- Location: Flemington Racecourse
- Date: 1 November 1904
- Distance: 2 miles
- Winning horse: Acrasia
- Winning time: 3:28.25
- Final odds: 10/1
- Jockey: Tom Clayton
- Trainer: A. E. Wills
- Owner: Humphrey Oxenham
- Surface: Turf
- Attendance: 85,000

The 1904 Melbourne Cup was a two-mile Group One handicap horse race which took place on Tuesday, 1 November 1904.

Franklyn Barrett filmed the Melbourne Cup. This was the first time the Melbourne Cup had been filmed from start to finish.

The placegetters were:

Place	Name	Jockey	Trainer
1	Acrasia	Tom Clayton	A E Willis
2	Lord Cardigan	J. Barden	A E Cornwell
3	Blinker	R. Brennan	James Wilson

== See also ==
- Melbourne Cup
- List of Melbourne Cup winners
- Victoria Racing Club
