= Pommy Arrives in Australia =

- Directed by: Raymond Longford
- Written by: Raymond Longford
- Starring: Lottie Lyell; Tien Hogue
- Cinematography: Franklyn Barrett
- Production company: Fraser Film Release and Photographic Company
- Release date: 11 August 1913
- Country: Australia
- Languages: Silent film English intertitles

Pommy Arrives in Australia is a 1913 Australian silent film directed by Raymond Longford. The director's first comedy, and the first purely comic feature made in Australia, Longford called it "the first comedy produced in Australia."

It is considered a lost film.

== Synopsis ==
An English immigrant is caught up in a series of comic incidents in Australia due to the actions of a trio of local tomboys.

Two of the film's incidents were described this way: "One day last week a new arrival, dressed in a conventional Norfolk jacket and a cap with the regulation check pattern, stepped out of a tramcar, and, quite ignorant of the fact that Sydney possessed a careful Lord Mayor, absent-mindedly dropped his ticket upon the road. He was pounced upon by one of the City Council's uniformed officials, and there ensued a strenuous and mirth-provoking passage-at-arms between the two. Later on the same 'Pommy' was seen out at La Perouse, surrounded by an excited horde of fearful cannibals, all bent upon testing imported stock."

== Cast ==
- Lottie Lyell
- Tom Cosgrove
- Tien Hogue
- Helen Fergus

== Production ==
There had been comic shorts made in Australia prior to this movie, such as Percy Gets a Job (1912) but this was the first feature-length comedy. Longford later went on to make the comedy short Ma Hogan's New Boarder.

== Reception ==
The film only had a short run in cinemas and is among Longford's least known works.

The film appeared on a bill with two supporting Australian films Christmas in Australia and Whaling in Jervis Bay.
