= Rock Phillips =

Australian actor and designer

George Edward "Rock" Phillips was an Australian actor and designer who worked in Australian theatre and film in the early years of the 20th century. For a number of years he was property master for J. C. Williamson Ltd.

== Select filmography ==
- For Australia (1915) - art director
- Officer 666 (1916) - art director
- In the Last Stride (1916) - actor
- Australia's Peril (1917) - - art director, actor, producer
- The Monk and the Woman (1917) - art director
- The Enemy Within (1918) - art director
- The Breaking of the Drought (1920) - art director
