= The Melbourne Cup (1904 film) =

1904 documentary film by Franklyn Barrett

- Directed by: Franklyn Barrett
- Cinematography: Franklyn Barrett
- Release date: 1904 (Melbourne)
- Running time: 2 minutes
- Country: Australia
- Language: Silent

The Melbourne Cup was a film about the two mile horse race won by Acrasia which took place on Tuesday, 1 November 1904.

Franklyn Barrett filmed the 1904 Melbourne Cup. This was the first time the Melbourne Cup had been filmed from start to finish.

It has been acclaimed as the first horse race filmed in full.
