= Henry Hayward =

Henry Hayward may refer to:

- Henry Rudge Hayward (1831–1912), British priest, Archdeacon of Cheltenham
- Henry John Hayward (1865–1945), New Zealand theatre and cinema proprietor
