= Acracy =

Acracy or acrasy may refer to:

- Akrasia, a lack of self-control or acting against one's better judgment
- a term in anarchism
- Acracy (plural acracies)

(politics, philosophy) In political philosophy, the negation of rule by "regency", or hierarchical "government". The absence of a "ruling class". A society with the absence of imposition or coercion; one of voluntary order.

== See also ==
- Accuracy and precision
- Acrasia (disambiguation)
- Anocracy, or semi-democracy
