= Silent Witness (disambiguation) =

Silent Witness is a British crime drama TV series.

Silent Witness may also refer to:

== Film ==
- A Silent Witness, lost 1912 Australian silent film
- The Silent Witness (1917 film), an American film starring Gertrude McCoy
- The Silent Witness (1932 film), an American mystery film directed by Marcel Varnel
- The Silent Witness (1962 film), an American film with cinematography by Richard E. Cunha
- Silent Witness (1943 film), an American film
- Silent Witness (1985 film), an American television film starring Valerie Bertinelli and John Savage
- Silent Witness (1994 film), a Canadian documentary film by Harriet Wichin
- Silent Witness (1999 film), an American film starring William Hurt and Jennifer Tilly
- Silent Witness (2013 film), Chinese crime thriller
  - Heart Blackened, a 2017 South Korean remake of the 2013 Chinese film

== Other uses ==
- Silent witness rule, a procedure in the United States justice system
- Silent Witness (horse) (born 1999), Thoroughbred racehorse
- "Silent Witness" (The Littlest Hobo), a 1979 television episode
- A Silent Witness, a 1914 detective novel by R. Austin Freeman
- Silent Witness, a 1976 novel by Susan Yankowitz
- Silent Witness, album by Jeff & Sheri Easter
