= The Life of a Jackeroo =

- Directed by: Franklyn Barrett
- Written by: J. H. Wainwright
- Starring: Tien Hogue; Tom Middleton
- Cinematography: Franklyn Barrett
- Production company: Fraser Film Release and Photographic Company
- Release date: 28 July 1913
- Country: Australia
- Languages: Silent film; English intertitles

The Life of a Jackeroo is a 1913 Australian silent film directed by Franklyn Barrett. It is considered a lost film.

== Plot ==
A young Englishman (Tom Middleton) leaves his actress girlfriend (Ruth Wainwright) to seek an experience in Australia. He works as a jackeroo on a property and falls in love with the daughter (Tien Hogue) of a wealthy squatter. They are happy until the actress arrives and joins forces with an evil overseer. They persuade some local aborigines to raid the squatter's home and capture the Englishman. The squatter's daughter rides to the rescue and a loyal aboriginal helps saves the day.

== Cast ==
- Tom Middleton as the Englishman
- Tien Hogue as the squatter's daughter
- Ruth Wainwright as the actress

== Production ==
The film was made immediately after A Blue Gum Romance using the same locations, much of the same cast and some of the same incidents.

Screenings were often accompanied by a lecturer.

== Reception ==
The film was popular at the local box office and screened in England and the USA.
