= Robbery Under Arms (1920 film) =

1920 film

- Directed by: Kenneth Brampton
- Written by: Kenneth Brampton
- Based on: novel by Rolf Boldrewood
- Produced by: Pearson Tewksbury
- Starring: Kenneth Brampton; S.A. Fitzgerald
- Cinematography: Lacey Percival
- Production company: Pacific Photo Plays
- Distributed by: Union Theatres
- Release date: 2 October 1920
- Running time: 53 minutes
- Country: Australia
- Languages: Silent; English intertitles
- Budget: £3,000
- Box office: £16,000

Robbery Under Arms is a 1920 Australian film directed by Kenneth Brampton and financed by mining magnate Pearson Tewksbury. It is an early example of an "Australian Western".

== Plot ==
Two brothers, Dick and Jim Marsden, become involved with the bushranger, Captain Starlight. They romance two girls, work on the goldfields, and are captured by the police after Starlight is shot dead.

== Cast ==
- Kenneth Brampton as Captain Starlight
- S. A. Fitzgerald as Ben Marsden
- Roland Conway as Dick Marsden
- Cliff Pyatt as Jim Marsden
- Roy Redgrave as Dan Moran
- William Pearson as Sir Frederick Moranger
- Stuart MacRae as Inspector Goring
- Jackie Anderson as Warrigal
- Vera Archer as Jennie Morrison
- Betty Crook as Miss Falkland
- Hilda Dorrington as Kate Morrison
- Tien Hogue as Aileen Marsden
- Austral Nichol as Mrs. Knightley
- Wilton Power as George Storefield
- Phyllis Ruthven as Grace Storefield
- Sybil Shirley
- Nan Taylor as Mrs. Marsden
- H. D. Wise as Mr. Knightley
- Charles Chauvel

== Production ==
There had been several attempts to make films based on Rolfe Boldrewood's 1888 novel since the bushranging ban by the New South Wales government in 1912. In particular there were attempts by Stanley Crick in 1916 and Alfred Rolfe in 1918. However Kenneth Brampton managed to secure permission for this 1920 version, mostly likely because it stressed the moral lessons of the story.

Kenneth Brampton and actress Tien Hogue managed to persuade the mining magnate Pearson Tewksbury to raise the budget and act as producer.

Brampton was acting in the play Lightnin' which he left to make the film.

The film was shot on location at Braidwood and in the Araluen Valley near Canberra. The bushrangers the Clarke brothers reportedly worked in this region.

Renowned horseman "Top" Hassall doubled for Brampton on the horse riding scenes.

Future director Charles Chauvel was working around the Sydney studios and attending to horses on the film. He has a bit part.

The film was the final acting role for Roy Redgrave who died in 1922.

== Reception ==
The movie was reportedly successful at the box office and grossed up to £16,000. However returns were so slow and the distributor and exhibitor took so much that Pearson Tewksbury was dissuaded from further film production.

Variety said the film was "of only fair quality, the picture just gets by."

Filmink called it "boring".

== Preservation status ==
A "copy comprising about three-quarters of the film" was found and combined with already known footage to produce a near-complete version. A five-minute sequence is still missing.
