= Acrasia (disambiguation) =

Acrasia is a lack of self-control, or irregular or unruly behaviour. It may also refer to:

- Acrasia (horse), a racing horse, 1904 Melbourne Cup winner
- Acrasia (moth), a geometer moth genus
- Acrasia (protists), a proposed phylum of protists
- Acrasia, a character in Edmund Spenser's epic poem The Faerie Queene
- Akrasia, a term in philosophy meaning a lack of mental strength, or the state of acting against one's better judgment

== See also ==
- Acrasin
