= West's Pictures =

- Industry: Entertainment
- Founder: Thomas James West
- Defunct: 1912
- Fate: Merged with Australasian Films
- Products: Film production, film exhibition

West's Pictures was a short-lived Australian film production and exhibition company during the silent era. It was established by English theatrical entrepreneur Thomas James West (1885–1916) who helped turn the company into one of Australia's largest exhibitors. The company also produced a regular newsreel and several narrative films, some made by Franklyn Barrett.

Many of their early films were contemporary stories made on a joint writer-technician-director basis.

West partnered with Henry Hayward in presenting films in New Zealand and Australia, supplementing the film show with variety performers, "The Brescians" later establishing a chain of cinemas in Australia, New Zealand and Great Britain, including:

- On 5 December 1908 West's "Olympia" (previously the Adelaide Glaciarium) opened in Hindley Street. Adelaide was the last of Australia's capital cities to have a permanent picture theatre.
- In 1909 Royal Hall (later West's Cinema) on the corner of Peter Street and Bath Street, St Helier, Jersey.

West's Limited merged with Australasian Films in 1912, becoming part of "The Combine" that later became the Greater Union organisation.

T. J. West's film company was often confused in the public mind with that of A. J. West's quite separate 'Our Navy' company (incorporated 1902), but there was no connection. However, T. J. West did secure the exclusive right in 1912 to show A. J. Wests's 'Our Navy' films in Bournemouth (Bournemouth Graphic, 27/09/1912).

== Select filmography ==
- The Christian (1911)
- All for Gold, or Jumping the Claim (1911)
- The Strangler's Grip (1912)
- The Mystery of the Black Pearl (1912)
- The Eleventh Hour (1912)
- A Silent Witness (1912)

== See also ==
- List of film production companies
- List of television production companies
