= The Mystery of the Black Pearl =

- Directed by: Franklyn Barrett
- Written by: Leonard Willey
- Cinematography: Franklyn Barrett
- Production company: West's Pictures
- Release date: 25 March 1912
- Country: Australia
- Languages: Silent film; English intertitles

The Mystery of the Black Pearl is a 1912 Australian silent film. A detective drama, It is now considered a lost film.

Of Sydney Stirling, Barrett wrote "I never knew an actor so responsive to direction, so keen to size up a situation and command it.”

== Plot ==
According to the Sydney Sportsman the story involves the robbery of a jewl from a wealthy banker by a criminal gang. The crime is blamed on the sweetheart of the banker's daughter, a naval officer.

== Cast ==
- Cyril Mackay as Dick Weston
- Sydney Stirling as Dudley Segrave
- Leonard Willey as Sam Grimm
- Charles Lawrence
- Joseph Brennan
- Irby Marshall

== Reception ==
The Prahran Telegraph praised the photography but wished more of Sydney could have been seen.

The Bulletin called it "quite equal to the average imported film."
