= The Dingo =

1923 film

- Directed by: Kenneth Brampton
- Written by: Kenneth Brampton; Phyllis Coughlan
- Starring: George Edwards; Godfrey Cass
- Cinematography: Lacey Percival
- Production company: British-Australasian Photoplays
- Distributed by: Duncan and Jones
- Release date: 23 June 1923
- Running time: six reels
- Country: Australia
- Languages: Silent film English intertitles

The Dingo is a 1923 Australian silent film directed by Kenneth Brampton. It is a melodrama about a drunken scoundrel who causes trouble. It is considered a lost film.

== Plot ==
"The Dingo" is a nickname for Harry Selby, a drunken thief from the city who loves animals and little children. He marries a country girl, Molly, despite knowing that she loves someone else, Dr John Stirling. Selby becomes passionately jealous of Stirling's attentions to Molly and is encouraged in this by Oily Allen.

Harry breaks into Dr Stirling's house and discovers a photograph of his wife. He picks it up, knocking over a vase, the sound of which attracts Stirling's servant. The servant rushes down with a revolver, there is a struggle and the servant is shot dead. This shot is head by a policeman who runs to the house and captures Selby, who is eventually sentenced to death.

The shock of this is too much for Molly who dies after giving birth to a baby daughter. Her last words to Dr Stirling ask him to look after her little girl.

Harry spends 18 years in gaol then gets out to find his daughter has been raised by Dr Stirling. Seeing how happy his daughter is, Harry does not tell her that he is her real father and she marries a nice young man.

== Cast ==
- George Edwards as Harry Selby
- Phyllis Coughlan as Audrey Onslow
- William Coulter as Oily Allen
- Sybil Shirley
- Godfrey Cass as Dr John Stirling
- Gordon Collingridge
- Charles Beetham
- Fred Twitcham
- Jackie Anderson
- Lena Edwards
- James Bendrodt
- Peggy Dawes

== Production ==
The film was shot partly on location in Mudgee, New South Wales in October 1922.

Phyllis Coughlan was a journalist who was married to Kenneth Brampton. A ballroom dance scene featured a popular dance duo of the time, James Bendrodt and Peggy Dawes.

George Edwards later became a noted radio star.

== Reception ==
The Adelaide Herald called the film "something new, different, fascinating, that will set the pulses beating quicker than ever. It is the kind of photo play everyone knew Australia would produce sooner or later."

However the film appears to have only been given a small release and it is unlikely it was a commercial success.
