= George Lauri =

English-born comic opera performer

George Lauri, c.1900

George Lauri was the stage name and preferred name of George John Lowe (c.1860 – 1909), an English-born comedian and performer in comic operas and musical comedies. Working first in England, he was working in the United States, for a decade, before he was brought to Australia, by J.C. Williamson, in 1891. Thereafter, he performed in both Australia and in New Zealand, in around sixty productions, achieving widespread popularity, critical acclaim, and renown. Retired due 'nervous prostration', by 1908, he took his own life, in early 1909. He was survived by his wife and their son. His memorial stone, in South Head Cemetery, carries his stage name, his profession 'Comedian', and the epitaph 'Alas poor Yorick'.

== Early years ==
=== England ===
Lauri was born into a theatrical family, in 1861. His father, John Lauri, was, he said, the leading member of a family company of pantomime artists, and another relative—sources vary, on an uncle or a cousin—was the leading animal impersonator in England. An obituary says that he first went on the stage at nine years of age.

Various sources state that he trained as an architect; one stating that he, "though articled to an architect in London for three years, spent his youthful evenings acting small parts at the theatres under assumed names." In a lengthy interview, from c.1906, Lauri recounted his early years in England, he stated that he had wanted to stay on the stage as a boy, but his parents made him continue in school, where he said that he won several prizes. He then had been articled as to an architect, whom he described as a 'worth gentleman'. However, he had begun to take singing and dancing parts—ones that few others wanted—while still working in architecture. Inevitably had begun a career on the stage. Subsequently, he joined the family pantomime company, where he stayed for several years and received his training as an actor.

He later worked in England, at the Britannia Theatre, Hoxton, where his future wife, Marietta Nash was "the favourite soubrette'" and Lauri was '"principal boy in the pantomime".

=== America ===
In an interview in 1905, Lauri stated that his father and the family company were playing in France and just managed to escape from Paris before it came under siege, in the Franco-Prussian War. From there, the family went to America.

Lauri said that he first played in America, in 1873, when he played a role in his family's pantomime production at the Grand Opera House, New York. It appears that the family returned to England and it was during this time that he attended school and was articled to an architect.

He later returned to America, touring for five years, performing A Bunch of Keys, with his new wife in another role.

== Career in Australia and New Zealand ==
=== Move to Australia and touring ===
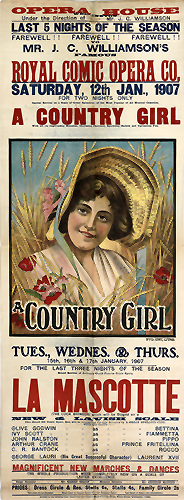
A poster promoting Royal Comic Opera Company shows (1907). Lauri's name appears in the cast of La Mascotte.

James Cassius Williamson (1845–1913), always better known as J.C. Williamson, was an American impresario, who founded, Williamson, Garner & Co. , colloquially known as 'the Firm'. Williamson had concentrated his activities on Australia, after he bought the Australian rights to HMS Pinafore In 1879. Australia, particularly Melbourne, was then entering an economic boom, and Williamson achieved great success. Even after the boom ended in the economic depression of the 1890s, Williamson's entertainments provided an escape from grim reality.

Williamson's business model was to bring shows—mainly comic operas or musical comedies—to Australia, but only those which had been hugely successful in London or the USA. Working in the golden age of comic opera and musical comedy, there were many such opportunities, virtually guaranteeing success in Australia. Typically, the shows opened in Melbourne, after which they were reprised in Sydney, and sometimes also ran in other cities such as Adelaide, Brisbane, Perth, and Auckland. With large distances between the Australasian cities, players regularly made long journeys by train or ship. Runs were short, and sometimes two or more shows were included in the same run. Sometimes performers had to take more than one role in the production, performing different roles in different scenes. For instance, in Robin Hood, in 1902, Lauri played three roles; the Sherriff of Nottingham, Sir Tristran Testy, and Sir Tristram Testy disguised as a tinker.

Williamson's productions used lavish costumes and scenery. He sometimes brought out stars of the time, such as Sara Bernhardt, for Australian tours. Anxious to preserve his right to use imported stars in Australia, J.C. Williamson was implacably opposed to the formation of an actors' trade union.

To mount his productions, he needed casts of locally-resident artistes, who could tour the various Australasian cities. Most of these were migrants from England, already experienced performers, but in time others were locally-trained, such as Nellie Stewart and W.S. Percy. Williamson founded the Royal Comic Opera Company, in 1880, as a vehicle which he used to run large productions of comic operas and musical comedies. It would be that company that George Lauri joined in 1891.

The English performer, William 'Billy' Elton, had been a stalwart of the Royal Comic Opera Company. Elton wanted to return to England. Williamson had noticed George Lauri, performing in New York, playing the Grand Inquisitor, in The Gondoliers. Williamson brought Lauri and his family—his wife, the actress, Marietta Nash, and their young son—to Australia, in 1891. Lauri's first performance in Australia was in The Merry Monarch. It had opened, at the Princess Theatre, with William Elton in the title role of King Anso, and with Lauri in the cast as Herrison.

George Lauri, c.1893,

After Elton left the company, Lauri toured Sydney and Brisbane, taking parts in five operas that were formerly played by Elton. After a tour of New Zealand, the shows returned to run in Melbourne, with Lauri by then seen as an accomplished success. Lauri's wife, using her maiden and stage name, Miss Marietta Nash, had also commenced work for 'the Firm', in the role of Follow-the-Drum, in The Old Guard.

Apart from one 'disastrous year', 1897–1898—when he worked for the rival theatre company of Harry Rickards—Lauri spent the rest of his theatrical career with 'the Firm', touring the major Australian cities and New Zealand. In 1897, he toured with the Rickards Company's farcical comedy, "A Bunch of Keys, which he directed. He lost uninsured personal belongings in the fire that destroyed the Bijou Theatre, in Bourke, on 3 November 1897.

Describing his experience in Australia, in October 1897, Lauri said, "'It is excellent; there can be no two opinions about it. Since I came out to 'the Firm ' six years ago, I have played in no fewer than 30 different operas, leaving out panto and other productions. That is more than any artist would play in a lifetime at Home, and the experience which a young artist would derive therefrom would be invaluable." His words provide a hint of the immense workload of touring.

A performance on the closing night, 30 April 1902, was given as a benefit to George Lauri, marking his ten years performing with the Royal Comic Opera Comany.

=== Attributes and popularity ===
Lauri was a versatile performer, an experienced actor, and a singer with a fine baritone voice, who could also dance, and he was funny. He was well suited to comic opera roles, and could work heavily made up when in character. In some productions, the 'heavy make up', when playing non-Europeans was what is now referred to as 'blackface'. His personal preference was for comic opera parts, but also performed in lower-brow musical comedies.

Lauri also gave interesting interviews, full of amusing anecdotes, being somewhat of a raconteur, which helped in publicising his shows. He had a prodigious work ethic, and was a role model for performers in training.

=== Roles ===
Examples of the roles that George Lauri played on tour in Australasia are:

- Herrison in The Merry Monarch, from December 1891
- Matthew Vanderkoopen, in La Cigale
- Bartolo the clown, in The Mountebanks
- Title role, in The Vicar of Bray, revived at Lyceum Theatre (Sydney), in May 1895.
- Ebenezer Honeycomb, in The Gay Parisienne, in August 1897.
- The hotel keeper, in A Bunch of Keys, Opera House, Brisbane, in September 1897, which he directed, for the Rickards Comedy Company.
- An old maid, in the pantomime, Jack the Giant Killer, for Rickards Comedy Company
- Wun Hi, tea house owner in The Geisha, at Princess Theatre (Melbourne), in 1898
- Hilarius, the doll maker, in La Poupee, Her Majesty's Theatre (Melbourne), in September 1900. also photo
- Fluellen, in Henry V, Her Majesty's Theatre (Sydney), March 1900.
- Sir Joseph Porter, in HMS Pinafore, at Her Majesty's Theatre (Melbourne), premiere in May 1900.
- Hassan the Philanthropist, in The Rose of Persia, at Her Majesty's Theatre (Melbourne), in November 1900
- Anthony Tweedlepunch, and also a Welsh harpist, in Florodora, Australian premiere at Her Majesty's Theatre (Melbourne), in December 1900.
- Sammy Gigg, in The Toreador
- Grand Inquisitor and Duke of Plaza Toro in the Gondoliers
- Lord Chancellor in Iolanthe
- Joe in Charity Begins at Home
- Ko-ko in The Mikado
- A comic part in the pantomime, Dijn Dijn
- Barry, in A Country Girl, which included a scene where his character impersonatied a girl
- William Lurcher, in Dorothy
- Pasha Pilsener, in The Casino Girl
- Celestin, in Madamoiselle Nitouche
- Jack Point, in Yeoman of the Guard
- Mr Girdle, in The Spring Chicken
- Chambudy Ram, in The Cingalee
- Meakin, in The Orchid
- Friar Tuck, the Sherriff of Nottingham, and Sir Tristram Testy (and in disguise as a tinker), in Robin Hood
- Bouillabaisse, in Paul Jones
- General Des Ifs, in The Little MIchus with its premiere at Her Majesty's Theatre, Sydney, in June 1906.
- Flipper, in A Runaway Girl
- Li, in San Toy
- M. Coquenard, in Veronlque, with its premiere at Her Majesty's Theatre, Sydney, in January 1906.
- Laurent XVII, in La Mascotte, revival in January 1907.
- Popoff (Baron Mirko Zeta), in The Merry Widow
- Max Moddelkopf in The Girls of Gottenburg
- Sam Brudenell, in The Dairymaids
- Joe Mivens, The Dairymaids
George Lauri in character

As Hilarius, the doll maker, in La Poupee, on right (1898)

As Hassan the Philanthropist, in The Rose of Persia, 1900.

As Barry, disguised as a woman, in A Country Girl (1904)

As Sammy Gigg, in The Toreador (1902)

As Wun-Hi, in Geisha (1898).

As Prof. Anthony Tweedlepunch, in Florodora (1900)

As Lurcher, in Dorothy, It was considered by many to have been Lauri's best part.

=== Career plateau and signs of trouble ===
By 1902, he had been with the company for ten years. In the years that followed, he was still an important cast member and popular with the public, but he was no longer full of confidence, perhaps no longer at his best, and increasingly found himself playing secondary roles.

A commentary in late 1905, noted an anxiety associated with first nights; "Nervousness is not the sort of thing that one usually associates with Mr. George Lauri, but nevertheless the first night of any new piece finds him invariably a prey to mixed emotions, in which apprehension that his part will not be successful has a large share. He is too good an artist to allow his inner feelings to be apparent from the front, and the thousands of playgoers who have laughed with him and at him never have the slightest suspicion that he is all the time undergoing a severe mental strain."

The same commentary went on the reassure Lauri; "But surely past experience should have taught him by this time that his efforts are always enthusiastically received, and that he, above all people, should never have any fear that the parts entrusted to him will not be most appreciatively received."

Around 1906. Lauri had been working, without a long break, for fourteen years, when the effects of overwork became evident. He declined to take a break then, and continued to keep to the punishing schedule of touring with 'The Firm'. Years later at the inquest into his death, it was revealed that he had trouble sleeping, which no doubt left him fatigued.

=== Breakdown and replacement ===
A report appeared quoting the New Zealand Herald of 12 February 1907; "Mr. George Lauri, of the Williamson Royal Comic Opera Company, Is at present suffering from nervous prostration, and will be unable to appear again during the company's Auckland season. At the wish of the management, he is taking a complete rest." It happened during the run of La Mascotte, in Auckland. Another comedian, W.S. Percy, successfully took over his roles on the tour.

By March 1907, it was stated that Lauri had suffered a nervous breakdown, but that "open air and sunshine" had led to a complete recovery. and that he would be certain to be ready for the company's Adelaide season.

=== Replacements ===
Williamson had others, who could stand in for Lauri, or even replace him if need be. One was Victor Gouriet (1874—1942). Although much younger than Lauri, he had 21 years of theatrical experience, and much of it playing parts—Meakin in The Orchid, Chambuddy Ram in The Cingalee, Li in San Toy, Coquenard in Veronique, Lurcher (500 times) in Dorothy—well known in Australia as being George Lauri's parts. He arrived from England, around June 1907, which was around the time Lauri briefly returned to work.

There was also the Melbourne-born comedian, W.S. Percy (1872—1946), who had been with 'the Firm' since 1905. Before that he had toured with another Williamson-associated venture, Pollard Opera Company, since 1891. Percy was already very experienced, and was well regarded by critics.

=== Brief return to work ===
Some months after his breakdown, George Lauri returned to the Royal Comic Opera Company, and created two last characters, Max Moddelkopf, in The Girls of Gottenburg, and Sam Brudenell, in The Dairymaids. In June 1907, he was back on the stage, in Sydney, performing in The Spring Chicken.

In September 1907, The Dairymaids opened in Melbourne. At a run in Sydney in February 1908, Lauri played the role of Joe Mivens, but one reviewer, in The Referee, described Lauri's performance as "somewhat more subdued than in previous parts".

It was announced, in February 1908, that Lauri would take a long rest, at the conclusion of the run of The Dairymaids. and would not be in the cast of the upcoming show, The Lady Dandies. It was also stated that he had taken only one break in 17 years of work. Lauri had played the part of a sailor, Joe Mivens, in The Dairymaids, in Melbourne productions, with other players in the principal roles. It would be his last role on tour. When the show again opened in Sydney, at the end of February 1909, George Lauri was dead, and his former role was played by W.S Percy.

=== Unhappiness ===
It was around the time that he briefly returned to work—a year or so before his death—that Lauri gave an interview to the Melbourne correspondent of The Referee. The content was only published after Lauri's death—Lauri had specified that it was not for publication, while he was on the stage—under the title line, Do comedians love their work?

The correspondent said that Lauri was cheerful, until the topic turned to his profession as a comedian. At that point, Lauri "became gloomy at once". Lauri then provided a somewhat disturbing insight into how he felt, at that time, about being a comedian.

"I hate it," he said with vehemence ; "I'd rather be a blacksmith than the stage funny man, for my life of jokes and other people's laughter, my sham merriment when I don't feel like it, the tone of hilarity and joyousness all around me, produced by myself, with .people screeching themselves hoarse and twisting themselves like caterpillars, with me the suffering victim and the cause of it— ugh ! it's horrible — I would much rather have been brought up to a trade, or put onto a farm, or anywhere, than go through the nightly agony of being funny, when I do not feel like it a bit. Of course I don't want to growl, for the game pays very well, but the innermost truth of the case is — and I don't say this, for publication while I'm on the stage; I don't mind afterwards — the truth, I repeat, is that stage joke-making is the reverse of whistling. When a man whistles, he is as a rule, the only person who enjoys it; when a man stage-jokes successfully, he is, generally speaking, the only one who does not enjoy it. In my case, I positively suffer, and have done so for years.'"

As his stage career came to a close, overwork was not his only problem; Lauri had become deeply unhappy.

== Family ==
When he was 21, Lauri married an actress, Marietta Constance Nash (c.1863 – 1937), who used the stage name, Miss Marietta Nash, and later Mrs George Lauri. They met at the Britannia Theatre, Hoxton, where Marietta Nash was "the favourite soubrette'" and Lauri was '"principal boy in the pantomime". A son, George, was born, c.1885, and the family moved to Australia in 1891.

The Lauri family, George Lauri (right), Marietta (centre), and their son George (left), c.1908.

Marietta continued to work after coming to Australia, including playing the part of Mrs Privett, in Dorothy, alongside her husband. playing Lurcher. Months after Lauri's death, on 3 April 1909, she embarked, as one of the cast, on the Royal Comic Opera Company's tour of New Zealand. Her later work included a part in the film The Shepherd of the Southern Cross, in 1914 and in the comic opera, The Marriage Market, in 1915. She did not remarry.

Their son George Merrilees Lauri (c.1885—1949) did not follow his parents into the theatre. He became a mining engineer and, from 1908, was working on the goldfield at Kalgoorlie-Boulder. He became engaged to a teacher, Miss Joyce in 1910. He was mill superintendent of the Kalgoorlie Ore Treatment Company, living in the suburb of Fimiston, when he died, aged 64. He was survived by his wife, two daughters and three sons. His remains lie in the cemetery at Kalgoorlie. One of his sons also had the name George Lauri.

== Later years and death ==
=== Recuperation ===
It was reported in early April 1908, that Lauri was recuperating at Bayview, would have a benefit performance—at Her Majesty's Theatre, Sydney—and then take an overseas trip with his wife. The benefit performance was to assist to pay for their travel. Lauri's son, George, had recently relocated to work in Kalgoorlie in Western Australia.

Lauri, c.1907, an image from a postcard. (David Elliott theatrical postcard collection, National Library of Australia)

=== Benefit performance ===
A benefit performance, held at Her Majesty's Theatre, Sydney, on 24 April 1908, was a great success. J.C. Williamson said that thousands had been turned away for lack of space. Even so, there were, "people standing four deep round the dress circle, and everywhere else it was possible to stand".

Lauri himself only performed in the last piece of the lengthy program; "Mr. Lauri, not so boisterous in manner as of old; but nevertheless looking well, played the part of 'Lurcher' in the Chanticleer Hall scene from Dorothy."

At the conclusion, Lauri did not make a farewell speech but said, "I can only say good-bye, and thank you all." Amid cheering from the audience, J.C. Williamson, quickly returned to the stage; "I could not," he said, "resist the opportunity of shaking hands with my old friend, George Lauri. The only difficulty met that day", he remarked, "was that the theatre was so small; if it had been ten times as large, it would not have been big enough to hold George Lauri's friends. They were turned away in thousands, but they left their good wishes behind them. Mr. Lauri had established a record, not merely for the amount of work he had done during his stage career, but for the splendid manner in which he had done it." Putting his hand upon the comedian's shoulder, Mr. Williamson concluded: "I am sure you will join me in wishing him good luck, good health, and a speedy return."

=== Retirement and replacements ===
The benefit performance would be his last; in effect, it was Lauri's retirement from the stage. The roles with which he had been so closely associated would be performed by others, notably Victor Gouriet.

=== Sea travel, planned and actual ===
Lauri and his wife planned an overseas holiday. It was reported that they would to visit London and then visit Marietta's mother—an English actress living on Long Island, New York—leaving Australia aboard R.M.S. Mongolia.

After his name was not found on the passenger list of R.M.S. Mongolia, in early May 1908, it was reported that Lauri had changed his mind, and would instead take a holiday in Japan. Another, apparently more accurate, report said that Lauri and his wife had delayed their departure by a fortnight. During early May 1908, the couple stayed at the Hydro-Majestiic Hotel at Medlow Bath, then a fashionable resort.

They left Sydney aboard, R.M.S Ormuz, on 23 May 1908. A report stated. "His present intention is to proceed to Fremantle (W.A.), but, if his health will then permit it, he will go to Colombo and there recuperate."

Lauri was interviewed after he arrived in Fremantle aboard R.M.S Ormuz, in late May 1908. He stated that he was sad to leave Australia, "But I have had 17 years of it here and I need a change." The report of the interview stated, "17 years of fun poking have told their tale on the robust frame, and suffering from nerves and overwork George is proceeding to London and the Continent in search of a health renewal." The next port of call was Colombo, and it would be the farthest point that Lauri and his wife reached.

George Lauri and his wife arrived back in Fremantle, aboard R.M.S. Moldavia, from Colombo, in late June 1908, after a just month's holiday in Ceylon, intending to stay some weeks, and spend some time with their son. A newspaper report stated that, "Mr. Lauri is considerably benefited in health, and is looking a different man." He left Kalgoorlie, at the start of July 1908, to return to the eastern states.

A report stated that he and his wife had left Sydney in early August 1908, aboard Manuka, bound for America. He and his wife were reported to have been in Brisbane, en route to America, in mid August 1908. Reportedly, the couple then spent some time in New York.

=== Mental decline ===
In November 1908, George Lauri and his wife, Marietta, arrived back in Sydney, aboard Marama from Vancouver. The news of his condition, upon return, was disturbing. One report stated, "The gay comedian went away ill and broken and he has come back but little recovered. Neurasthenia, the most insidious and deadly of nervous complaints, has overwhelmed him, and no relief has come so far. Mrs. George Lauri—better known, perhaps, as Miss Marietta Nash—is assiduous in her attention to her husband. But the man who a short time ago used to make all Australia laugh is now so reduced in nervous energy that he cries like a child over the simplest things. Unless the unexpected happens, it will be necessary to organise another benefit for the comedian. The public of Australia cannot desert its favourites in their hours of adversity."

Mrs Lauri was later to state that she did not think that her husband's condition was serious enough to have him "shut up". Lauri, accompanied by his wife, retreated to La Corniche, a guesthouse and tearoom that stood on the shore of Pittwater at Bayview. La Corniche was run by a French couple, Henri and Hedwig Rainaud. Bayview, now an outer suburb of Sydney, was in those times a more isolated locality, seen as a quiet seaside retreat.

It would later be revealed that his wife had noticed Lauri's memory was failing, during the stay in Colombo, in June 1908. It was also later revealed that on New Years Day, 1909, he had run off into the bush, emerging hours later in a bedraggled state, claiming to have been chased by four men. Some days later, said that the dog he had walked had rescued him from the same four men. He was hallucinating. He stated, more than once, a wish to end his life, rather than go mad. According to his doctor, he then became more cheerful for a few days, and what happened next was entirely unexpected by the doctor.

=== Suicide and inquest ===
The facts of Lauri's death were established, by the inquest held at the Manly Police Court, on 11 January 1909, by which time Lauri had been buried for some days.

At around 11:45 a.m., on the morning of 5 January 1909, Lauri had been alone on the veranda of the cottage when he cried out, "Come here, Marie. Quick! Look! Look!" She replied, "All right; I will be there In a minute." She then went to him. He was sitting on a bench, with a razor in his hand, and a cut to his throat. She called out to Mrs. Rainaud, the boarding house keeper, but Lauri then went into a bedroom, calling out "Keep them away. Don't let them come in." Mrs Lauri and Mr Rainaud forced their way into the room, at which point the dying Lauri fell into his wife's arms, saying, "Forgive me, I can't live this life any longer." His wife asked Lauri, "Why did you do it?." He replied, "Forgive me, I thought you might not love me." The dying Lauri asked them to lie him down, saying, "Marie, I have always loved you". Mrs Rainaud corroborated Mrs Lauri's evidence.

Dr Thomas was summoned at 10 minutes to 12. After arriving, he found the left jugular vein had been severed. The doctor's view was that Lauri had already been dead for half an hour. A police constable, called from Mona Vale, secured the razor, noting a pool of blood where Lauri had been sitting. The Coroner's verdict was that Lauri had died "from haemorrhage, caused by a wound in the throat, self inflicted whilst deceased was of unsound mind."

=== Funeral ===
Lauri's funeral was held on the afternoon of 6 January 1909. The body had been brought to Mrs P. Kirby and Son's funeral parlour, in Castlereagh Street, on that same morning. A crowd, estimated at 1,500 or 2,000 people, watched as the funeral cortege left, bound for South Head Cemetery, around 3 p.m.. By a melancholy coincidence, on the same afternoon, there was another large crowd, at Central Station. watching another funeral procession, for fifteen naval sailors, who had drowned after a collision on Sydney Harbour, also on 5 January 1909.

At the graveside, Rev. A.H. Champion, of the Anglican church, Vaulcluse, conducted the burial service. Among the mourners were J.C. Williamson, Williamson's Melbourne-based business partner, George Tallis, and many of Lauri's colleagues from the Royal Comic Opera Company. Owing to a matinee performance of the Duchess of Danzic, some of his former colleagues could not attend. An observer noted that the plaque on his coffin, bearing his real name, George Lowe, was almost obscured by the numerous floral tributes.

Lauri's remains lie in South Head Cemetery. His memorial. bears his stage name, the word comedian, the date of his death, his age, just 49, and the epitaph 'Alas poor Yorick'. Years later, in 1937, his widow Marietta was interred in the same grave. The inscription includes the words, 'Erected by J.C. Williamson'.

== Aftermath ==
Lauri's death received widespread coverage in Australian newspapers. He was admired by his theatrical colleagues. W.S. Percy saw Lauri as one the main influences on his own comic style..

One of Lauri's achievements was to be one of the founders of a fund, Royal Comic Opera Fund. After Lauri's death, W.S. Percy recalled, "His work in connection with the fund and the Old Actors' Fund did credit alike to his head and his heart, and will not soon he forgotten. The original members of the Royal Comic Opera Fund numbered 100, and the amount distributed in sick pay in the first half-year was under £40. Since then the membership had Increased up to the beginning of December last to 250, and .the yearly disbursement In sick pay, medicine, and funeral expenses to £450. In seven and a half years the total reached £2300, and in addition the fund has been instrumental in providing £1,630 for the distressed actors of Sydney and Melbourne." It was the closest thing to an actors' union that could exist under 'The Firm'.

Lauri's replacement, W.S. Percy, at first continued in comic roles. He acted in a film, in 1912, and subsequently left Australia. In the 1930s, he wrote travel books. Lauri's other replacement, Victor Gouriet, remained in Australia, and he acted in three Australian films made during the 1930s. Another of Lauri's erstwhile colleagues at the Royal Comic Opera Company—both played principal roles in Florodora—Wallace Brownlow, when unemployed and destitute, also cut his own throat, in 1919.

Within a few years of Lauri's death, the golden age of comic opera began to wane. Silent cinema partially replaced theatre, as entertainment for the mass market. However, Williamson continued to have huge successes and to bring imported stars in Australia. J.C. Williamson died in 1913, but the organisation survived him, first under Geoge Tallis, and then the Tait brothers. The Royal Comic Opera Company survived, until around 1930, when the combined impacts of talking pictures, radio broadcasts, and the Great Depression finally brought it to an end. The profitability of the J.C. Williamson organisation was later affected, in the late 1950s and 1960s, by competition from television and cinema. It continued to produce live musical shows, until 1976. Its archives are held, as the Williamson Collection, by the National Library of Australia.

Recollections of George Lauri, his roles, and performances continued to be made in the popular press in Australia, into the 1930s. His spirit was supposedly summoned in seances around 1938. Over time, the memory of him has faded, but for his humorous epitaph.
