= The Eleventh Hour (1912 film) =

- Directed by: Franklyn Barrett
- Based on: play by Leonard Willey
- Cinematography: Franklyn Barrett
- Production company: West's Pictures
- Release date: 13 April 1912
- Country: Australia
- Languages: Silent film; English intertitles

The Eleventh Hour is a 1912 Australian silent film. It is considered a lost film.

== Plot ==
The script is based on a play "showing the adventures and vicissitudes in the life of a Girl Telegraphist".

The action consisted of four acts:

- Act 1 – 'Pangs of Jealousy'
- Act 2 – 'Bad Blood'
- Act 3 – 'The Distress Call'
- Act 4 – 'The Eleventh Hour'

== Cast ==
- Cyril Mackay
- Sidney Stirling
- Leonard Willey
- Charles Lawrence
- Loris Brown
- Irby Marshall

== Production ==
Of Sydney Stirling, Barrett wrote "I never knew an actor so responsive to direction, so keen to size up a situation and command it.”

== Production ==
The cast worked for JC Williamsons.

== Release ==
The film was shot in Sydney and released in that city in 1912. It screened in London in September 1913 under the title Saved by Telegram.

The critic from The Sydney Morning Herald said that "the story is a thrilling one, whilst the cinematographic work of Mr. Franklyn Barrett, the West expert, is particularly good."

The Sun called it "one of the finest pictures yet shown under the West, Ltd., management. The play itself, too, has much to commend it, especially since the love story running through it is not of a maudlin character. The piece is splendidly acted."
