= Sandy McVea =

Australian boxer

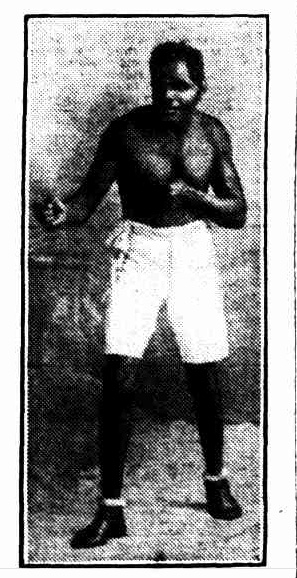

Personal information
- Nationality: Australian
- Born: Sandy McPherson
- Died: February 4, 1923 Broken Hill, New South Wales
- Weight: 8 st (112 lb; 51 kg) 10.5 ounces

Boxing career

Sandy McVea was an Aboriginal Australian boxer and actor.

Originally from Western Australia, he later began boxing with the promoter Snowy Baker. He fought in the featherweight division, including bouts against Greek boxer Jack Brown in 1919 as well as the Victorian champion Bert McCarthy (which he lost on points) and Harry Pearson (whom he knocked out) both in early 1921. A contemporary report on the latter bout said:

"McVea knocked him down for nine seconds in the eleventh round with a right swing to the jaw, and again put him on the floor early in the twelfth term. A little later he knocked him out with a right to the body. The crowd cheered McVea's success. The aborigines is a scrupulously fair boxer, and no doubt Melbourne followers of the sport will welcome his next appearance in the ring."

McVea featured in the 1918 silent film The Enemy Within playing an Aboriginal detective.

He died of tuberculosis in the Broken Hill Hospital in February 1923.
