= Thomas James West =

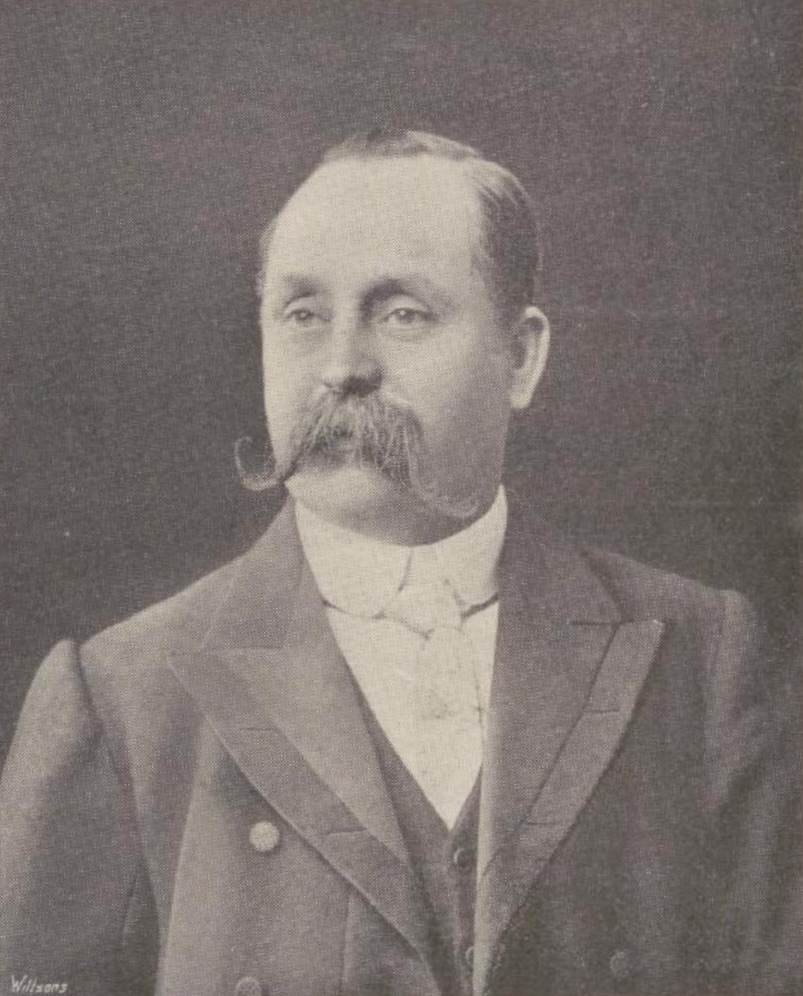
Thomas James (T. J.) West in 1906

Thomas James West (1855 – November 1916) was an English-born theatre entrepreneur. He toured stage companies in the US, New Zealand and Australia and in 1908 established West's Pictures in Australia.

Over the next few years it became one of the most significant film exhibitors in Australia and New Zealand, eventually branching out into production. In 1912 this company merged with Australasian Films.
