= The Breaking of the Drought =

1920 film

- Written by: "Jack North" (identified as Percy Reay)
- Based on: play by Bland Holt and Arthur Shirley
- Produced by: Franklyn Barrett
- Cinematography: Franklyn Barrett
- Production company: Golden Wattle Film Syndicate
- Release date: 19 June 1920
- Running time: 6 reels
- Country: Australia
- Languages: Silent film English intertitles

The Breaking of the Drought is a 1920 Australian silent film from director Franklyn Barrett based on the popular play by Bland Holt and Arthur Shirley. (Note: Shirley (perhaps Arthur George Shirley (17 February 1853 – 21 August 1925) was early employed in the Prints and Drawings department of the British Museum. Shirley also wrote the plays A Lion's Heart, Straight from the Heart, A Grip of Steel, The Path of Thorns, A Wife's Peril, The Absent-Minded Beggar, Riding to Win, The Stepmother, A Desperate Game, Is She Guiltless ?, Jo, a Girl in a Thousand, The Midnight Mail, The Power of Passion, The Mother of His Child, Under the Influence, Driven from Home, and Woman and Wine. He cowrote The Scarlet Sin, Two Little Vagabonds and In London Town (aka Lights o' London Town?) with George R. Sims. He is the "reputed" author of The Merry Widow, or Cleopatra. A King of Crime has been attributed to Shirley and Benjamin Landeck. who wrote Tommy Atkins. The Work Girl was written by George Conquest and Arthur Shirley. The melodrama My Old Dutch has been credited to Shirley and Albert Chevalier.)

According to Graham Phillips, this film is one of the most damaged in Australia's film archive, although few sequences have severe damage.

== Plot ==
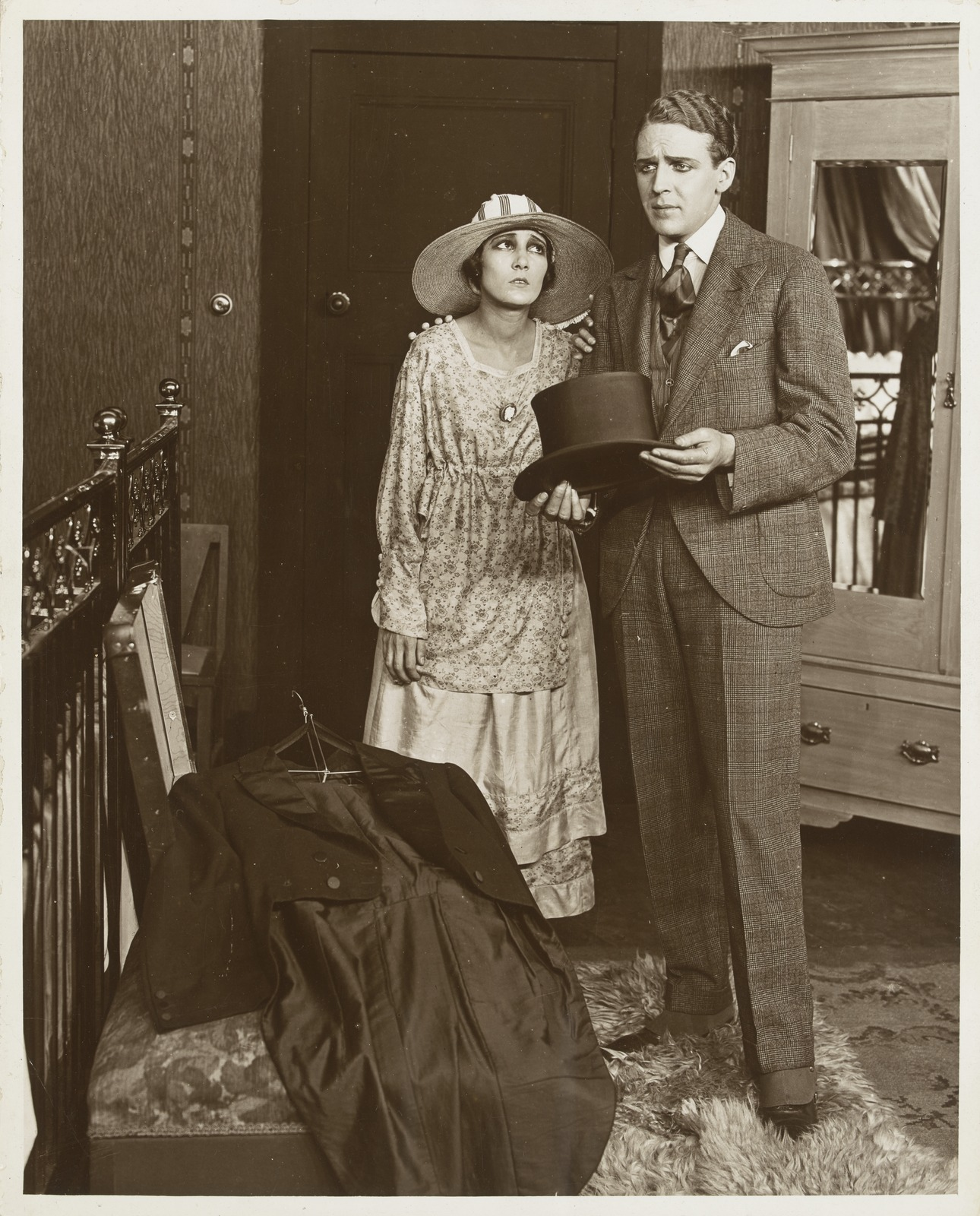
Marjorie: "Go back to the Bush ...There's plenty of honest work." Marjorie Galloway (Trilby Clark) and Gilbert Galloway (Rawdon Blandford). Collection State Library Victoria

Drought causes Jo Galloway to lose possession of Wallaby Station to the bank. He moves to the city with his wife and daughter Marjorie to stay with his son Gilbert. He discovers that Gilbert has been embezzling family funds and has fallen in with conman Varsy Lyddleton and femme fatal Olive Lorette.

Lyddleton murders Olive then kills himself. Marjorie's boyfriend Tom Wattleby saves Gilbert from a bushfire, just as the drought breaks, restoring the family's fortunes.

== Cast ==
- Trilby Clark as Marjorie Galloway
- Dunstan Webb as Tom Wattleby
- Charles Beetham as Jo Galloway
- Marie La Varre as Olive Lorette
- John Faulkner as Varsy Lyddleton
- Rawdon Blandford as Gilbert Galloway
- Nan Taylor as Mrs Galloway
- Arthur Albert as Walter Flour
- Ethel Henry as Molly Henderson

== Original play ==
The Breaking of the Drought
- Original language: English
- Written by: Bland Holt; Arthur Shirley

Premiere
- Date: 26 December 1902
- Place: Lyceum Theatre, Sydney

The film was based on a 1902 Australian play written for Bland Holt by English playwright Arthur Shirley.

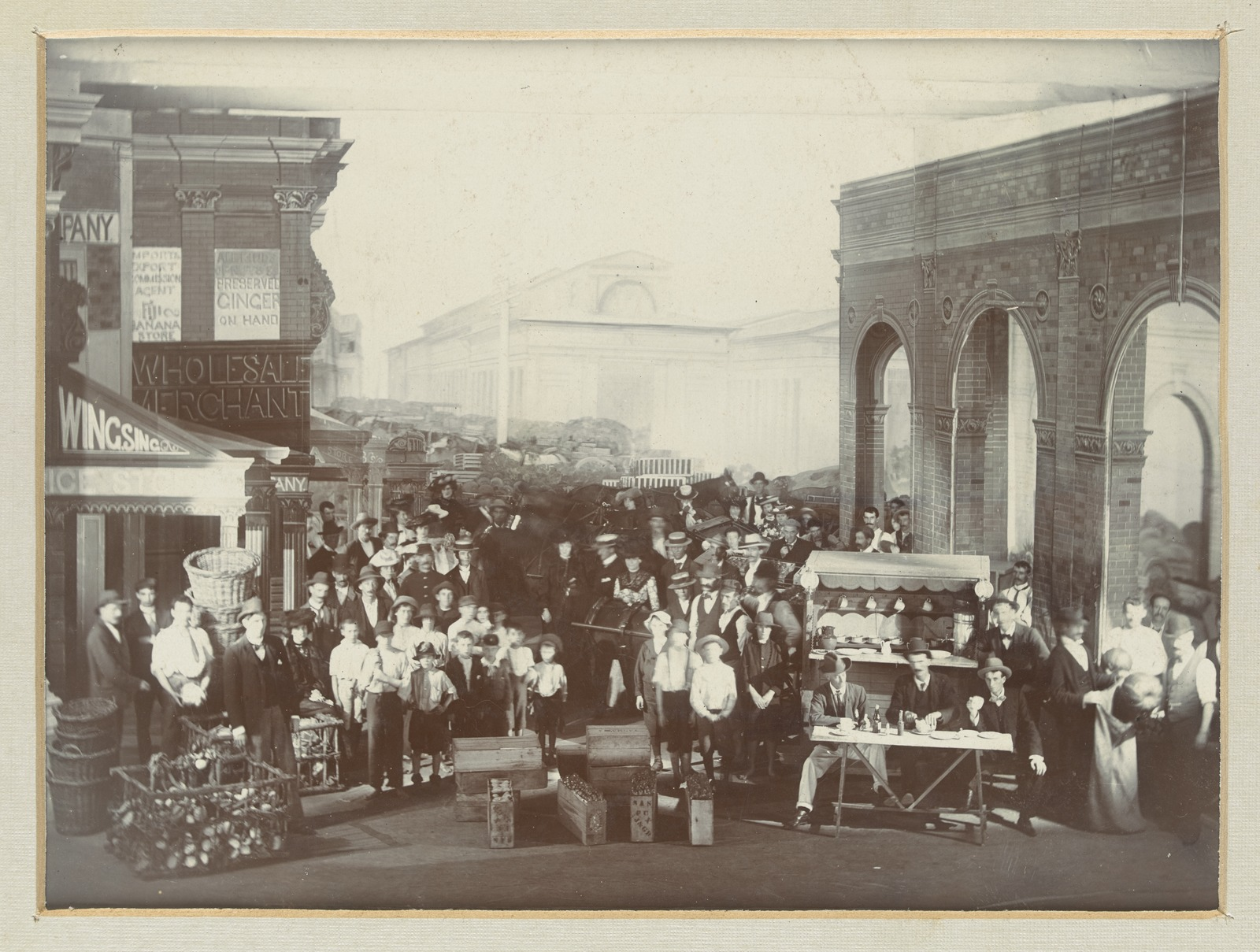
Scene from stage production The Breaking of the Drought 1902 Collection State Library Victoria

=== Synopsis ===
In 1902, at drought-stricken Wallaby Station in New South Wales, a squatter, Jo Galloway, lives with his wife and daughter Marjorie while his son Gilbert trains to be a doctor in Sydney. Gilbert falls in with bad company, in the shape of financier Varsey Lyddleton, who encourages him to forge his father's name on some cheques and ruins his family. A neighbouring squatter, Tom Wattleby, who loves Marjorie Galloway, returns from a trip to India to find the father working as a lamp cleaner and the daughter was a maid. The neighbour rescues the family and the father swears vengeance on his son. However, during a bush fire that ends in a heavy rain that breaks the drought, the hero rescues Gilbert.

=== Reception ===
The play made its debut at the end of 1902 and was very popular. Audiences and critics were particularly impressed by the stage design, which included things like real horses, recreations of Paddy's Market, swimming pools and real trees.

Annette Kellerman appeared in a 1903 production.

Holt later adapted another play of Shirley's, The Path of Thorns, to an Australian setting, calling it Besieged in Port Arthur.

== Production ==
Bland Holt had refused offers to film his play for a number of years until approached by Barrett and Percy Rea. He was impressed with the job they did on The Lure of the Bush.

Shooting began in December 1919 in Narrabri and Moree, with interiors filmed at a temporary studio at the Theatre Royal in Sydney.

An additional sequence was shot consisting of a water ballet and a diving display by "water nymphs", shot in the National Park near Sydney. This sequence is missing from most versions of the film.

Barrett wrote the bedroom scene was considered "suggestive".

== Reception ==
Smiths Weekly thought it would "probably make money". Newcastle Sun said "the camerawork is excellent."

Female lead Trilby Clark went to the US after filming and worked in theatre and movies.

== Controversy ==
A New South Wales MP, Mr Wearne, asked questions in parliament complaining that the film's depiction of drought could create a bad impression overseas. An investigation was launched by the Chief Secretary's office, who later assured Wearne that new legislation meant that the export of the film could be banned by the Minister of Customs if he deemed it to be "harmful to the Commonwealth".

== Lost film ==
The film was thought lost until 1976, when several rusty film cans containing copies were found under a house in Hornsby.
