= Roland Conway =

Australian actor and producer (1882–1960)

Roland James Conway (born James Edward Wayland; 1882 – 16 June 1960) was an Australian actor and producer best known for his work in silent films of the era. In the 1930s, he was president of the Actors' Federation of Australasia.

In 1927, he married Australia tennis player Floris St. George, who played at the 1922 Australian Open. She died age 83 in February 1968.

== Select filmography ==
- For the Term of His Natural Life (1908)
- Strike (1912)
- Gambler's Gold (1912)
- The Shepherd of the Southern Cross (1914)
- Australia's Peril (1917)
- The Woman Suffers (1918)
- Robbery Under Arms (1920)
- Know Thy Child (1921)
- Painted Daughters (1925)
- The Romance of Runnibede (1928)

== Select theatre credits ==
- The Silence of Dean Maitland (1915)
- The Worst Woman in London (1917)
- The Evil Men Do (1917)
