= Kenneth Brampton =

Australian actor, writer, and director

Kenneth Brampton (died 21 June 1942) was an Australian actor, writer and director. He acted in England before coming to Australia. He later ran an acting school.

== Filmography ==
- Robbery Under Arms (1920) – actor, director
- The Dingo (1923) – director, writer
- The Hayseeds (1933) – actor
- Splendid Fellows (1934) – writer
- Uncivilised (1936) – actor
- Typhoon Treasure (1938) – actor
