= Bland Holt =

Australian comedian and producer

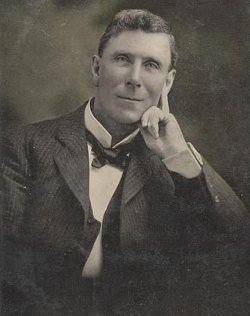
- Born: 24 March 1851; Norwich
- Died: 28 June 1942
- Occupation: Theatrical producer

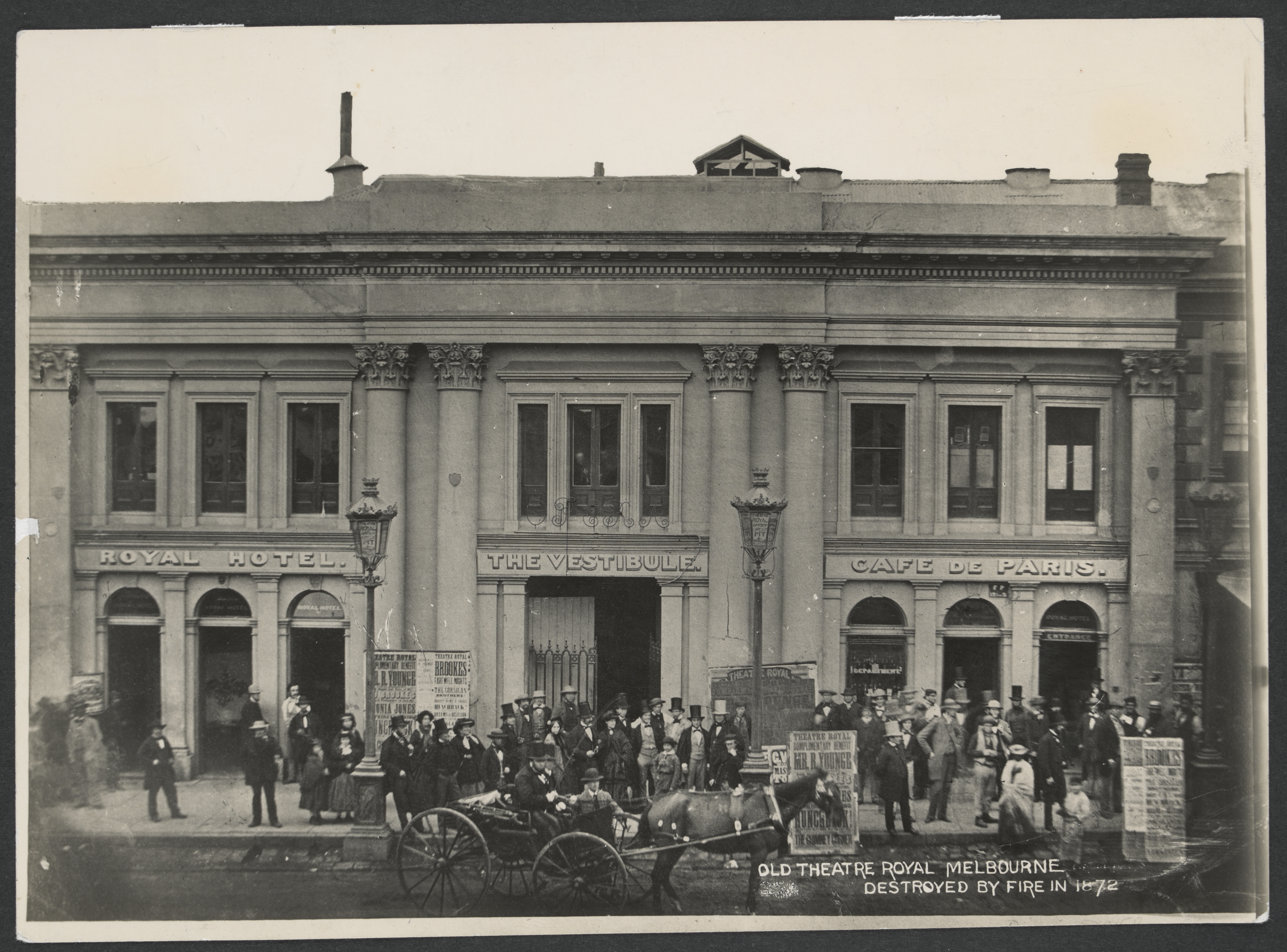
Theatre Royal, Melbourne

Bland Holt (born Joseph Thomas Holt, (24 March 1851 – 28 June 1942) was a comedian and theatrical producer, active in Australia. He was one of the foremost actor-managers of the early Australian stage for three decades and widely dubbed the "King of Melodrama" for the lavish and spectacular productions staged by his company.

== Biography ==
The son of Joseph Frederick Holt (known as Clarance) and his first wife Marian Vaughan (known as Marie and stage name 'Marian Browne'), Holt was born at Norwich, England on 24 March 1851. His father was a successful tragedian and sailed to Melbourne, Australia in September 1854 at the suggestion of Australian impresario, George Coppin, returning with his family 1858. Bland Holt made his first stage appearance at the age of six, at the Royal Theatre Sunderland and during his early life, moved around Australia and New Zealand following his father's work.

== Career ==
Holt returned to England aged 14 years and became a professional actor but returned to Sydney in 1876. His first production was Paul Merritt's play New Babylon at the Royal Victoria Theatre, Sydney, with Myra Kemble as the leading lady. The play launched his career as an actor-manager and started a six-week Sydney season on 24 April 1880 before moving to the Theatre Royal, Melbourne. He established his own company in Sydney in 1880.

Over the next thirty years, Holt produced the principal melodramas of the day, dividing his company's seasons between the Lyceum Theatre, Sydney and the Theatre Royal, Melbourne, where his productions enjoyed record runs. He appeared in many of his own productions as a pantomoime clown and comedian, personally supervised every detail and rewrote dialogue to modernise plays.

== Influence on Australian Theatre and Stagecraft ==
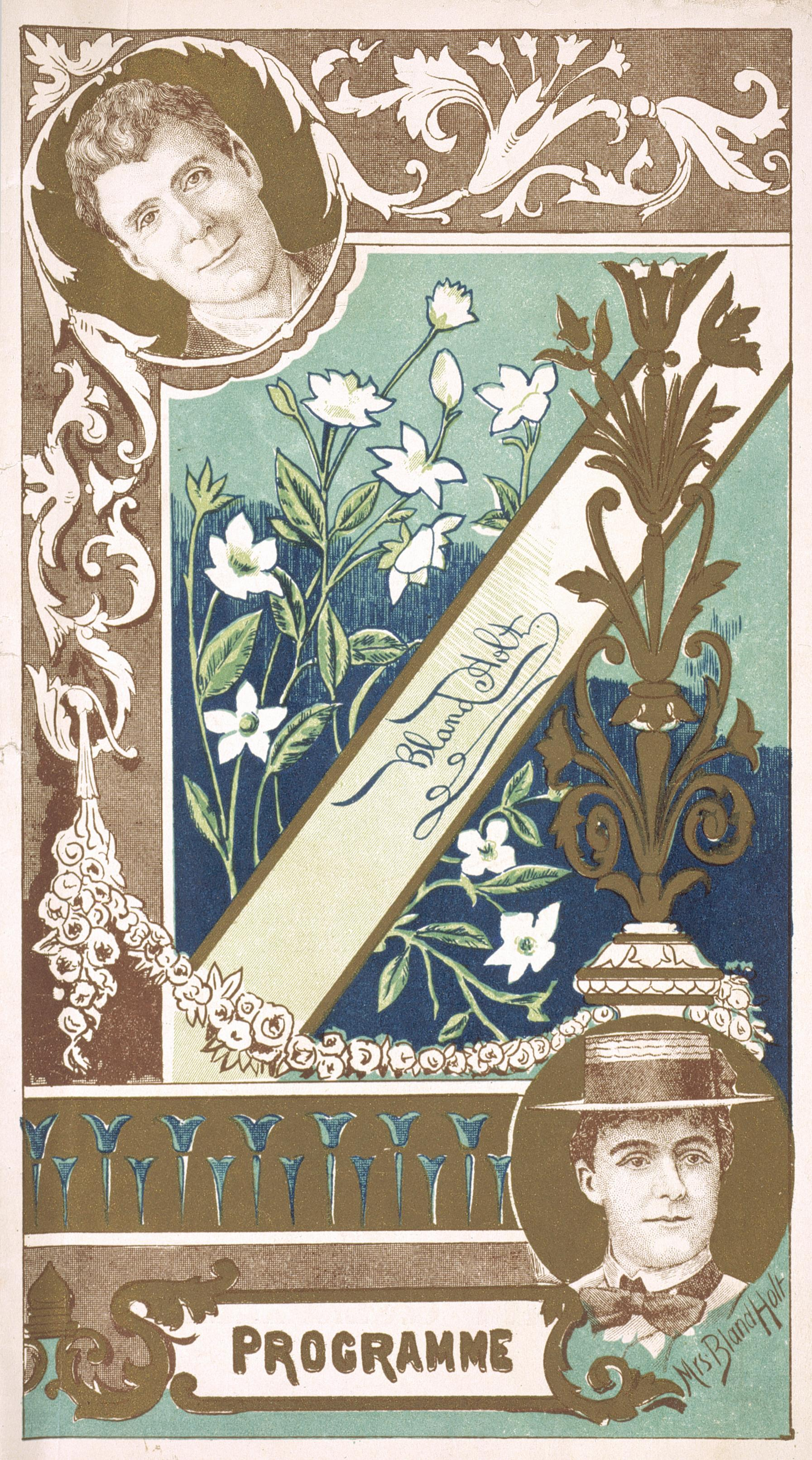
Theatrical program cover for a performance by Bland Holt (1899)

Dubbed the "King of Melodrama", Holt became well known for the spectacular realism of his stagings. He worked closely with Scottish-born scenic artist John Brunton, who would build a scale model stage and Holt and Brunton would refine the sets in detail before the full-sized scenery was painted. Holt's love of the spectacle meant that in one play, there would be a hunting scene with live horses, hounds and stag, whilst another play would introduce trained pigeons, diving scenes and famously, the first motor car on stage.

Towards the end of his career, Holt introduced distinctively Australian subjects to his repertoire. Holt adapted Arthur Shirley's play The Breaking of the Drought, for Australian audiences. The stage was set with real horses, water and a realistic bushfire. The Breaking of the Drought was later made into a silent film in 1920, directed by Franklyn Barrett.

Holt helped to launch the careers of several Australian performers including John Cosgrove, Dorothy Brunton, Madge Titheradge, Vera Pearce and Marie Lohr.

A collection of theatrical material relating to Holt survives, including playbills, model sets and posters in the George Coppin Collection at the State Library Victoria.

== Retirement and later life ==
Holt retired in 1909, after a farewell tour of Europe, North America and New Zealand with his wife and secretary, Lucy Coppin (daughter of George Coppin).

Holt died in East Melbourne aged 91 on 28 June 1942, and is buried in the Boroondara General Cemetery. His wife survived him, dying in 1946.

== Personal life ==
Holt's first wife, who appeared on stage as Lena Edwin, died in June 1883. On 29 September 1887, in Adelaide, he married actress Florence Griffiths Anderson (daughter of William Curling Anderson). Anderson appeared with him in many of his productions, the couple being much sought after.

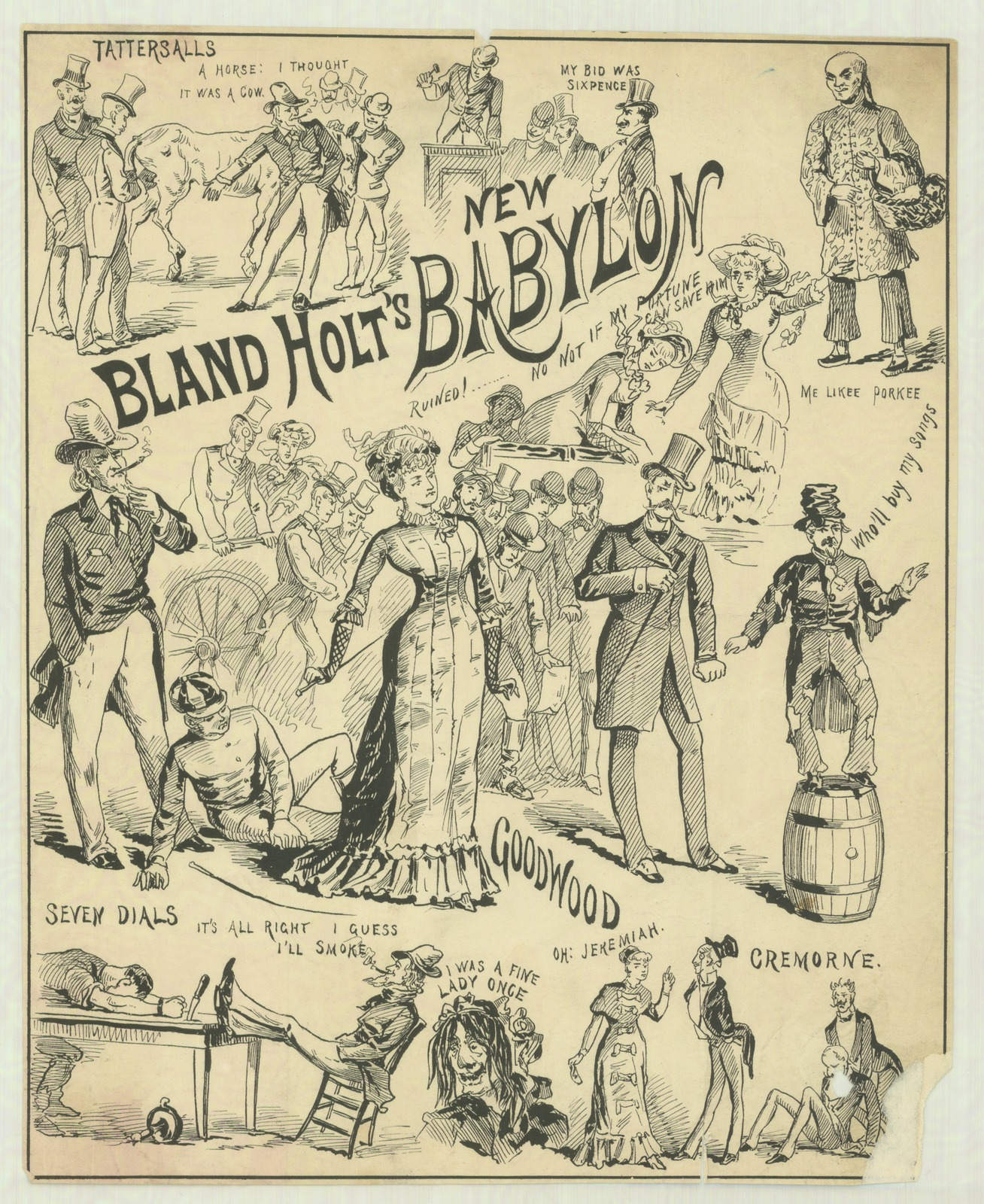
Bland Holt's New Babylon (handbill)

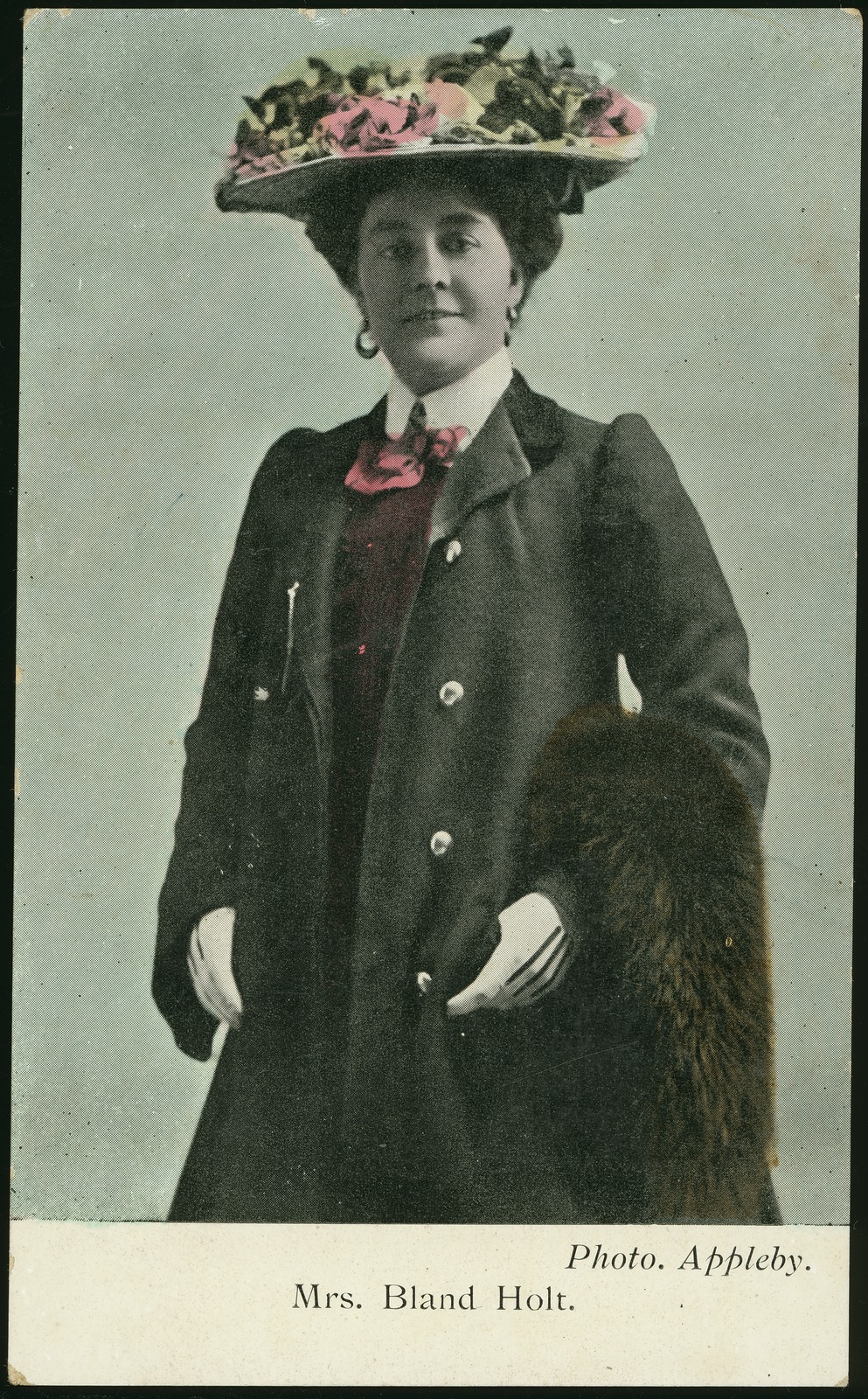
Mrs. Bland (Florence) Holt

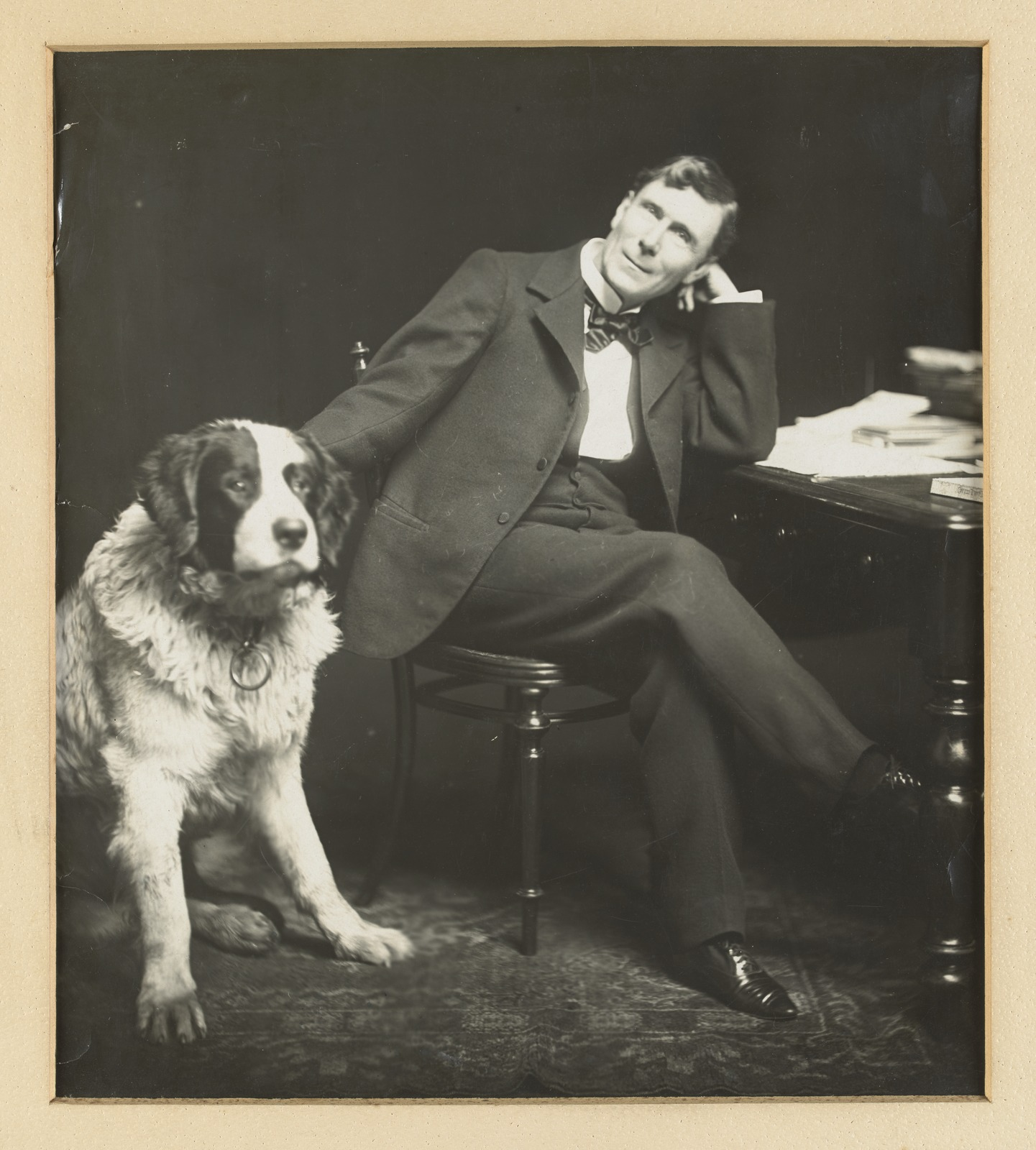
Actor Bland Holt with dog

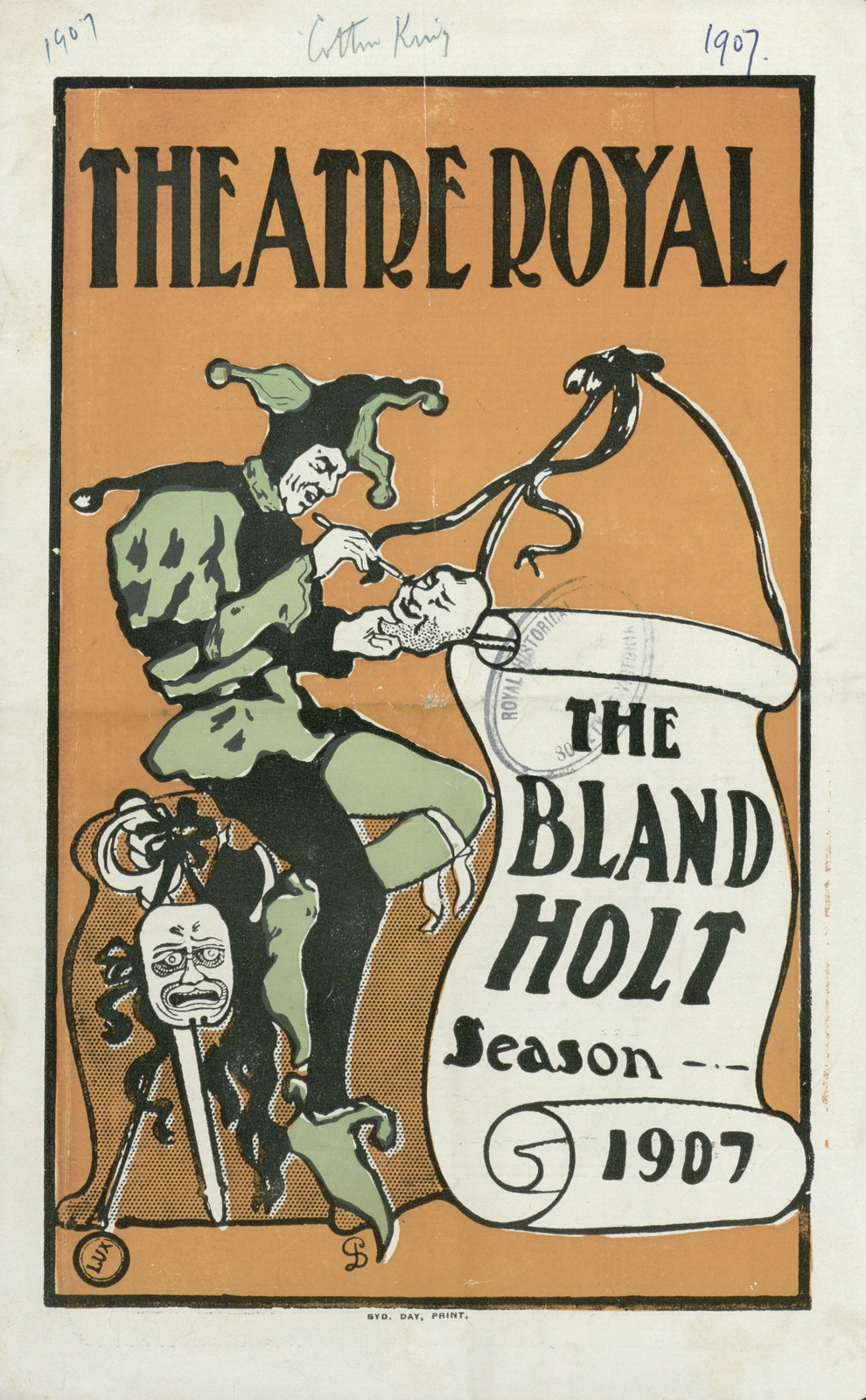
The cotton king. Bland Holt Season 1907

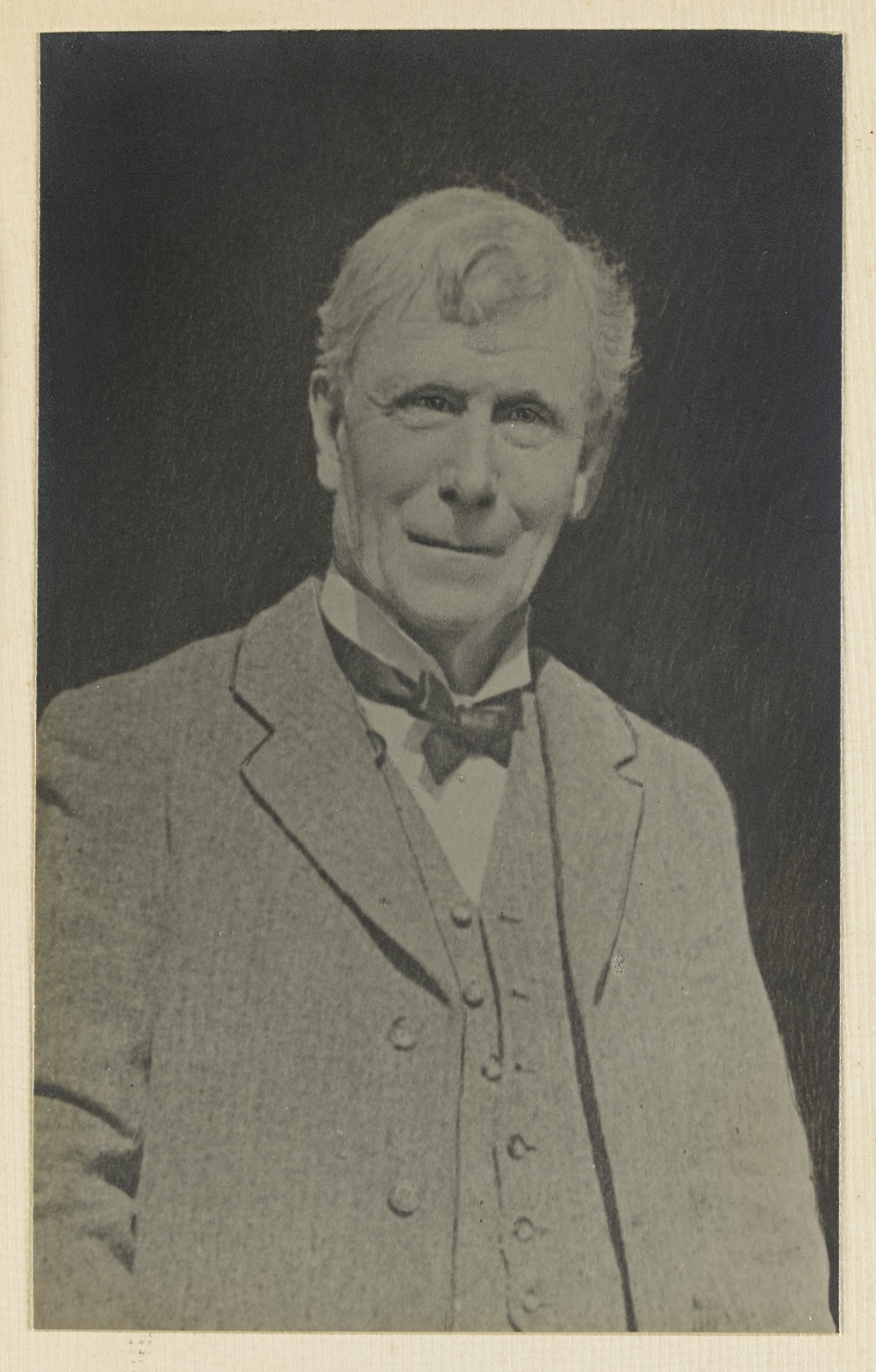
Actor Bland Holt in old age

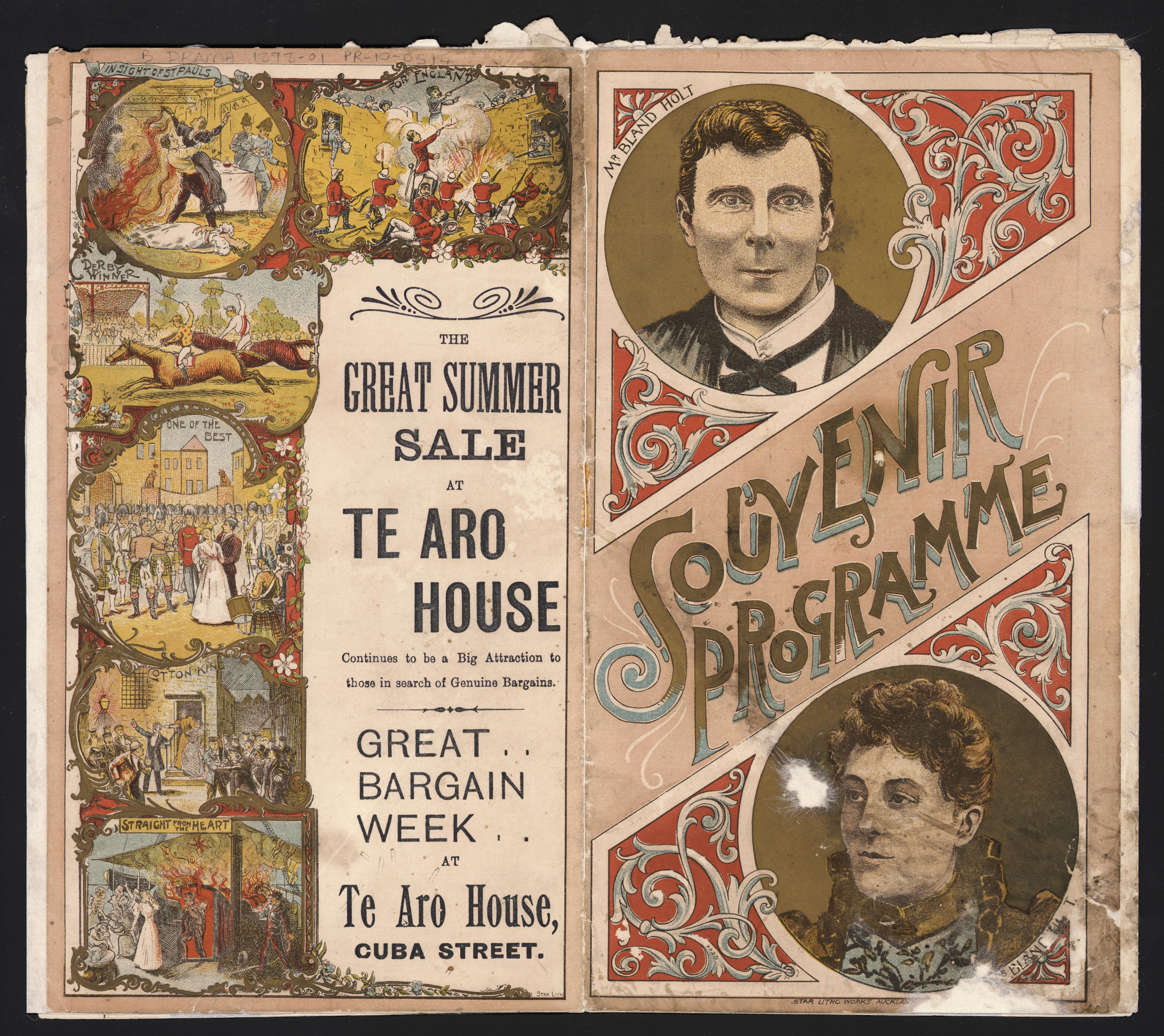
Bland Holt souvenir programme

== Plays ==
Holt's early repertoire of "twenty-four new and original dramas" adopted from Drury Lane included The Bells of Haselmere, A Million of Money, The White Heather, The Fatal Card, The Prodigal's Daughter and The Great Millionaire.

- Breaking the Drought (1902)
- The Great Rescue (1907)
