= Tien Hogue =

Australian actress (1892–1964)

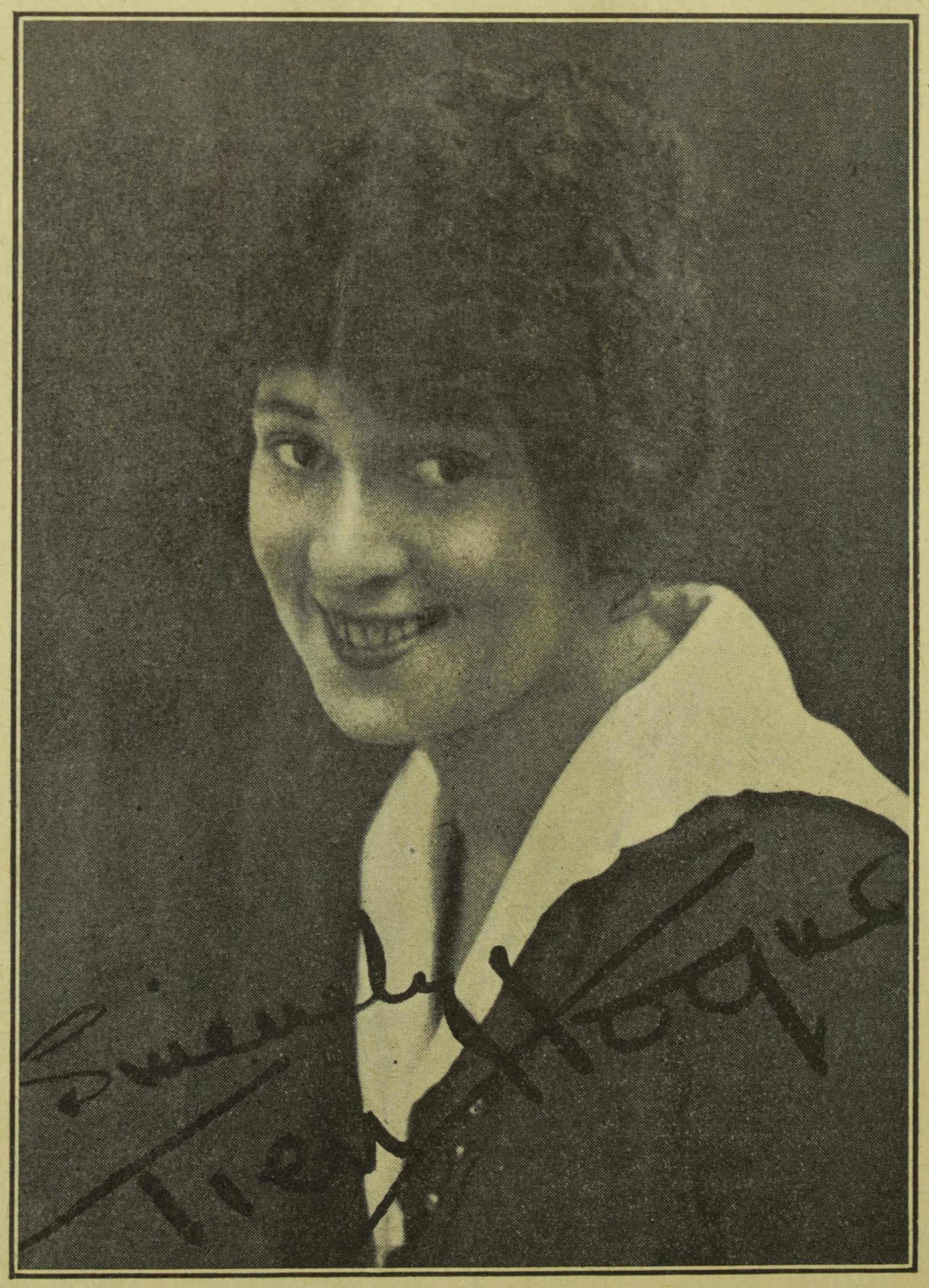
- Portrait of Tien Hogue, published in Lone Hand magazine in January 1918.
- Born: Anne Christina Hogue; 29 June 1892; Glebe Point, Sydney, New South Wales
- Died: 1 November 1964 (aged 72); Tasmania
- Occupation(s): Film and stage actress

Tien Hogue was the stage name of Anne Christina Hogue (29 June 1892 – November 1964), an Australian actress of stage and screen in the silent era.

She was a popular personality, who, though marriage, became Lady Wyatt.

== Family ==
The fourth daughter, and youngest child of James Alexander Hogue (1846–1920), and Jessie Hogue (1853–1932), née Robards, Anne Christina Hogue was born at Glebe Point, Sydney, New South Wales on 29 June 1892.

She was the sister of Major Oliver Hogue (1880–1919), who wrote under the name of Trooper Blue Gum, and of John Roland Hogue (1882–1958), the talented professional singer (baritone), Broadway, film, and U.S.television actor, and playwright.

She married Guy Wyatt (1893–1981) of the British Navy, later Vice-Admiral Sir Arthur Guy Norris Wyatt, K.B., C.B. on 19 January 1922, and moved to England. The couple later settled in Tasmania.

== Stage and screen ==
"Tien Hogue, a good-looking Sydney girl, with a honey-sweet speaking voice, [who is soon to tour country towns as "Aggie Lynch" in Veiller’s play, Within the Law] gave such an intelligent reading of the part of Victoria Chope in [the new Haddon Chambers play] "Sir Anthony", at the Repertory Theatre, that she is likely to prove a bright addition to the native-born stage contingent." – The Bulletin, 30 July 1914.

=== Selected theatre credits ===
- Within the Law (1914)
- Quinneys (1917)

=== Selected film credits ===
- The Life of a Jackeroo (1913)
- Pommy Arrives in Australia (1913)
- A Blue Gum Romance (1913)
- The Shepherd of the Southern Cross (1915)
- Robbery Under Arms (1920)

== The Dicker Case ==
She was a witness in the Dicker case where the Tasmanian Labor MP David Edward Dicker (1882–1967) was charged with "disloyal utterances", in his making of statements likely to prejudice recruiting.

== Death ==
She died in Tasmania in November 1964.

== Archibald Prize ==
Tien Hogue was the subject of an Archibald Prize finalist painting by Joseph Wolinski (1872–1955) in 1926.
