= Myra Kemble =

Australian actress (1857–1906)

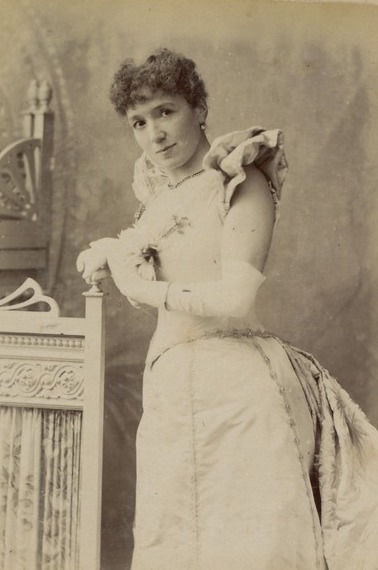
- Born: Maria Teresa Gill; 17 November 1857; Sligo, Ireland
- Died: 27 October 1906 (aged 48); Melbourne, Victoria, Australia
- Occupation: Actress
- Years active: 1874–1900
- Spouse: James David Whitehead (m. 1878)

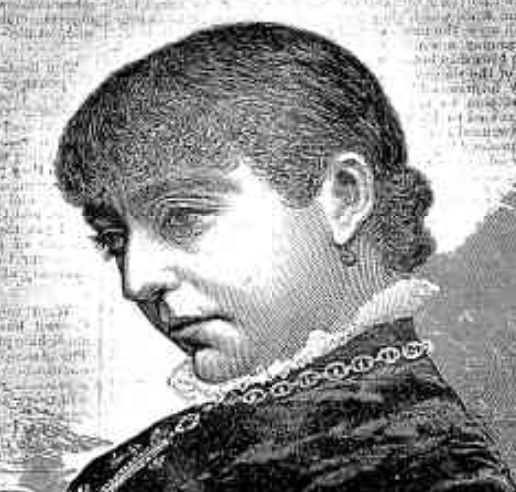
Myra Kemble (1857–1906), Australian stage actress

Myra Kemble (17 November 1857 – 27 October 1906) born as Maria Teresa Gill, was an Australian stage actress.

== Life ==
=== Early life and career ===
Myra Kemble was born on 17 November 1857 in Sligo, Ireland, the only daughter of Pritchard and Teresa Joseph Gill née O'Donnell. She was reportedly named Maria Teresa Gill at birth, "Myra Kemble" being a stage name.

She emigrated to the Colony of Victoria when she was seven, and was educated at Geelong Convent School. Kemble's onstage debut was in around 1872–1873 at the Old Queen's Theatre in Sydney. In 1874, Kemble made her stage debut as Venus in a pantomime at the Theatre Royal, Melbourne titled Twinkle Twinkle Little Star. She starred in Bland Holt's first Australian production of New Babylon at the Victoria Theatre in 1877, and won wide praise as Biddy in Transported for Life, May Meredith in Our American Cousin and as the fool in King Lear.

She was the youngest Lady Macbeth to have appeared on the Australian stage to that time and by 1880 her salary had reached £40 a week. For some years she held the place of "leading lady" in various companies, and has been equally a favourite in all the cities of Australia and New Zealand.

In 1890 Miss Kemble paid her first visit to England, when she purchased the colonial "rights" of Dr. Bill, by Charles Hamilton Aide, and other pieces. During her sojourn in London, Mr. Robert Buchanan wrote the play Man and the Woman especially for the popular colonial actress, who produced it at a matinée at the Criterion, where, however, despite excellent acting, it did not prove successful. After Miss Kemble's return to Sydney she made a brilliant reappearance at the Criterion Theatre in that city in Dr. Bill, and she toured the various colonies.

In May 1896 the Sydney theatrical community staged a major benefit concert for her at the Lyceum Theatre. She toured with her own company in 1897–98 before retiring from the stage around 1900.

== Personal life ==
On 10 December 1878 Kemble married Mr James H. White (known as 'Eyeglass White'), a Sydney bookmaker, at St Mary's Cathedral in Sydney (following on from the earlier registration of their marriage at a registry office in Melbourne).

After her husband's death she lived with her mother. Kemble died in Melbourne, Victoria, Australia, on 27 October 1906.

== Select theatre credits ==
- New Magdalen
- Queen Mary
- Uncle Tom's Cabin
- Pygmalion and Galatea
- Hamlet (1877)
- King Lear (1877)
- The Woman in White (1878)
- Arrah-na-Pogue (1878, 1880)
- The Heir at Law
- In Chancery
- Hans, the Boatman
- East Lynne (1880)
- The New Babylon (1880)
- Youth (1885)
- Sophia (1888, 1889)
- Dr Bill (1890, 1891)
- Moths
