= The Enemy Within (1918 film) =

- Mirror 8 March 1918
- Directed by: Roland Stavely
- Written by: Franklyn Barrett
- Story by: Roland Stavely
- Produced by: Rock Phillips; Franklyn Barrett
- Starring: Snowy Baker
- Cinematography: Franklyn Barrett
- Production company: Spencers Ltd
- Release date: 9 March 1918
- Running time: 82 minutes
- Country: Australia
- Languages: Silent film; English intertitles

The Enemy Within is a 1918 Australian silent film starring Australian sportsman Snowy Baker in his first screen role.

Unlike many Australian silent movies, the film survives today.

== Synopsis ==
Jack Airlie is a secret agent who has worked for four years abroad. He returns to Australia after four years away and falls for Myree Drew, beautiful daughter of his oldest friend, Mrs Drew. Rich businessman Henry Brasels is also in love with Myree.

Brasels is running a gang of German saboteurs, including radical agitator Bill Warne, who is planning to set off a series of bombs. Brasels lures Jack into a trap but he manages to escape with the help of his sidekick, detective Jimmy Cook. Brasels kidnaps Myree and tries to get aboard a German ship, however Jack manages to rescue her. The Coastal Patrol capture Warne and Brasels.

== Cast ==
- Snowy Baker as Jack Airlie
- John Faulkner as Henry Brasels
- Lily Molloy as Myree Drew
- Nellie Calvin as Claire Lerode
- Billy Ryan as Bill Warne
- Sandy McVea as Jimmy Cook
- Lily Rochefort as Mrs Drew
- Gerald Harcourt as Glassop
- Marjory Donovan as the child

== Production ==
National Film and Sound Archive curator Paul Byrnes has suggested that the film was a vehicle for Snowy Baker, keen to rebuild his profile after bad publicity surrounding the death of boxer Les Darcy in May 1917. Byrnes notes that Baker had been accused of persecuting Darcy after he left for the US. Baker's Sydney boxing stadium was also losing money. Byrnes also speculates that the film may have been timed to support the 1917 Australian conscription referendum.

The story was by Roland Stavely, a stage director for J. C. Williamson Ltd. Franklyn Barrett turned it into a scenario. The plot was partly inspired by real-life events, such as the raid of the SMS Wolf in the Pacific during World War I, and the sinking of the Cumberland off Gabo Island. The villains were based on the Industrial Workers of the World, and shown to be operating in Sydney high society.

Filming commenced in December 1917. The plot featured plenty of action sequences, designed to demonstrate Baker's physical prowess. These included climbing down a 300-foot cliff, leaping from a moving car, diving 80-foot into Sydney harbour at Coogee Bay and hand-to-hand fighting.

The part of Snowy Baker's assistant was played by Sandy McVea, an Aboriginal boxer. It was speculated at the time that it was the first significant performance by an Aboriginal actor in an Australian film. Female lead Lily Molloy had started her career aged fifteen and was a stage comedienne.

== Release ==
The Sun 10 March 1918

The film was previewed at the Theatre Royal in Sydney on 28 February 1918 and officially launched on 13 March at the Strand. The film was specifically advertised as "not a war picture but a thrilling drama of a special agent's fight against spies in Australia".

The Daily Telegraph praised the photography but reported that the film suffered through a "lack of sufficient plots and indifferent acting." The Sunday Times described it as "another upward step in the local film industry, for the producer has got away from the backblocks or early settlers' tales that usually represent Australia on the screen. This is a drama of city life, meant to show the working of a spy system. So skilfully are the facts of the Gabo mines and the Cumberland loss mingled with the mass of fiction that the whole bears the color of truth." But the reviewer also noted "plenty" of faults - "It is too long, for instance, and the secret meeting-house is ridiculous. Its hidden entrances, and walls with mysterious trap doors, are as out of place, at least in Australia, as the slinking walk of the conspirators. Yet everything considered, the picture looks like the beginning of better and more ambitious local productions."

The Sydney Sun felt "Under more experienced and critical directorship" the film "might have been an excellent one. Much of the plot material is good, and some of it is very well handled, especially in the outdoor scenes, but generally it lacks that certainty of touch with which the export gives precision and finish to his handiwork. The strength of "The Enemy Within" lies in action rather than characterisation and intrigue."

The film was a commercial success and almost immediately Baker started organising his second - The Lure of the Bush - using some of the same cast.
