= Dummy Mace =

Staged short boxing movie

- Directed by: Franklyn Barrett
- Produced by: Franklyn Barrett
- Starring: Dummy Mace; Tommy Macgregor
- Cinematography: Franklyn Barrett
- Release date: 1901
- Running time: 3 minutes
- Country: New Zealand

Dummy Mace is a 1901 New Zealand silent short film.

== Plot ==
The film shows three rounds of a staged boxing match, with a third round knockout.

== Cast ==
- Tommy Macgregor - featherweight boxer (champion in New Zealand)
- Harry "Dummy" Mace - middleweight boxer (champion in Australia)

== Production ==
Alf Linley offered Franklyn Barrett finance to produce a boxing picture. Barrett organised two boxers to stage a three one minute round boxing match on the back lawn of the Hotel Cecil. Although Macgregor was to give a knockout blow on cue in the third round, Mace who was deaf, had misunderstood the arrangement and actually knocked out Macgregor.

The resultant film did very good business when subsequently shown in the Federal Hall theatre in Manners Street Wellington.

== Preservation status ==
This 1901 film was New Zealand's first boxing film and is now a lost film.
