= All for Gold, or Jumping the Claim =

- Directed by: Franklyn Barrett
- Written by: W.S. Percy
- Cinematography: Franklyn Barrett
- Production company: West's Pictures
- Release date: 9 October 1911
- Running time: 3,000 feet
- Country: Australia
- Languages: Silent film English intertitles

All for Gold, or Jumping the Claim is a 1911 Australian silent film directed by Franklyn Barrett. Only a few frames of the film survive.

It was also known as Quest for Gold.

== Plot ==
Englishman Jack Cardigan (Herbert J. Bentley) strikes gold and writes a letter to his girlfriend, Nora (Lilian Teece), to tell her of the news. He gives the letter to a friend, Ralph Blackstone (Hilliard Vox) who poisons Cardigan's drink, throws his body in the river and takes over his claim.

However, when in Sydney, he accidentally allows the letter to come into Nora's possession and she decides to investigate. While Blackstone goes back to the mine by train, she tries to beat him there by taking a speedboat across Sydney Harbour, then driving a fast car. She arrives to find Cardigan still alive and recovering. Cardigan gets his claim back and is reunited with Nora.

== Cast ==
- Herbert J. Bentley as Jack Cardigan
- Hilliard Vox as Ralph Blackstone
- Lilian Teece as Nora Fraser
- Ronald McLeod as Bert Fraser
- E. Melville as warden
- Walter Bastin as Jim Carey

== Production ==
In 1911, the newly established West's Pictures wanted to get into feature production. They offered a £25 prize for a story about Australian life best suited for screen adaptation; bushranging themes were barred. Over 200 entries were received and the winner was stage comedian W.S. Percy for this script.

The car chase scene was shot near Springwood in the Blue Mountains. Lilian Teece had to drive a car alongside the passing of a fast train. The train arrived an hour earlier than scheduled and Teece had to chase after it. "Passengers craned their heads through the windows and urged the driver of the train not to be beaten by a woman", said a contemporary newspaper report. Teece got in front of the train just before the train disappeared in a cutting. "If I had not passed him before I passed the camera I would have followed him to Bathurst", said Teece.

The movie featured an early example of split-screen technology, with one scene showing Nora making a phone call, a boatman receiving the call, and Sydney harbour in between.

Frankly Barrett was an experienced cameraman with a number of years making scenic films and coumentaries. He said, "I have had more pleasure in cinematographing All for Gold, for West's than in all the others [films he made] put together."

== Reception ==
The film ran for a week, at a time when that was rare for films, and screened in London.

The Sun called it "splendidly acted" and "a fine specimen of outdoor cinematography."
