= The Lure of the Bush =

- Truth 26 October 1918
- Directed by: Claude Flemming
- Written by: Franklyn Barrett
- Story by: Percy Reay as "Jack North"
- Produced by: Rock Phillips; Franklyn Barrett
- Starring: Snowy Baker
- Cinematography: Franklyn Barrett
- Production company: Snowy Baker Films
- Distributed by: E. J. Carroll
- Release dates: 30 September 1918 (Australia); 1919 (US)
- Running time: six reels
- Country: Australia
- Languages: Silent film; English intertitles
- Budget: £1,500
- Box office: over £20,000

The Lure of the Bush is a 1918 Australian silent film starring renowned Australian sportsman Snowy Baker. It is considered a lost film.

== Synopsis ==
Hugh Mostyn (Snowy Baker) is sent from his family station to England for an education and returns to Australia years later as a "gentleman", complete with a white suit and monocle. He seeks work as a jackeroo and is teased by station hands who pretend to hold him up as bushrangers, but he beats them all up. He also breaks into a wild brumby, takes part in a kangaroo hunt, defeats the station bully (Colin Bell) in a boxing match, wins the heart of the manager's daughter, and later rescues her from a rejected suitor.

== Cast ==
- Snowy Baker as Hugh Mostyn
- John Faulkner
- Rita Tress as Trixie Stanley
- Claude Flemming as Harry Darvell
- Colin Bell
- Joan Baker as rider

== Production ==
The movie was made by the same producers as Snowy Baker's first film, The Enemy Within, Franklyn Barrett and Rock Phillips.

The script was the prize winner in a competition held by the Bulletin. It was written by journalist Percy Reay.

The film was shot at Wills Allen Gunanden statio and Sir Charles Mackellar's Kurrembede station at Gunnedah.

One scene involved a joke being played on the lead that bushrangers were still active. There was a ban about the depiction of bushrangers at the time. Franklyn Barrett says police visited the set and amendments to the script had to be made. Harvey Nowland a former driver for Cobb and Co did the coach riding.

The female lead, Rita Tress, was a real life squatter's daughter.

Colin Bell was a real-life boxer and his on-screen fight with Baker went for five minutes.

Claude Flemming, director, later claimed this was the first film to feature a kangaroo hunt.

=== Reshoots ===
Baker visited Hollywood in 1918 and re-shot some sequences there at Jesse Lasky's studios for its American release.

He came back with American filmmakers who made his next three movies.

== Release ==
=== Reception ===
The Journal 6 December 1919

The film was given a press screening at Film House in Sydney on August 26, 1918. It was attended by the Minister for Health, JD Fitzgerald.

The Mirror called it "miles apart from anything made here."

The Sydney Morning Herald praised it as a "remarkable success that has been achieved In reproducing what may be termed the atmosphere or the Australian bush... a really fine production."

The Referee said "The production is certainly an eye-opener as evidencing what can be done in that way in Australia."

The Sun said "there are feats in the Australian film which for originality and daring cannot but command the respect of specialists in this class of work the world over. The 'prentice hand which was plainly visible in... The Enemy Within dwindles to comparatively microscopic proportions in The Lure of the Bush. This happy result is largely the outcome of the simplicity of the theme selected for treatment, and the recognition by Mr. Baker and his associates of the limitations which as yet beset the making of pictures in this country... simple in plot, brisk and direct in action, basing its appeal upon Incident rather than complexity of intrigue or the development of character."

The Bulletin said it "shows Snowy Baker in a series of stunts that might make even Douglas Fairbanks tired; especially notable is his all-in fight to a finish with a black-haired youth whose name deserves to be on the programme."

=== Box office ===
The film broke box-office records in its first week. It was enormously popular and earned an estimated £20,000 in profit.

The Bulletin reported in December 1918 that the movie "has not only broken all Australian records for a local film, besides beating the figures of several big imported features, but it has received the approval of the fight and horse fans, whose name in this country is legion... It is to be sold in England; it is certain of a warm welcome in France; and when revised to suit American tastes will doubtless sell well in that country."

The film was still screening in cinemas as late as 1924.

Claude Flemming later reflected, "There was no doubt that Australians were interested in pictures made in their own country. That was soon proved. What the real difficulty consisted in was to obtain theatres to show the picture in... People were told that we hadn’t the photographers. We proved we had. They were told then that we hadn’t the actors, we showed them they were jolly well mistaken. They were told that we hadn’t the cameras to take up-to-date pictures, so we imported the very latest available... At last, after weeks of negotiations, we got a theatre in Sydney. Lots of people remember the queues that waited all day outside the theatre, stretching for half a block. I don't suppose any greater popular interest has been shown in a picture."

The quality of the film impressed Bland Holt who gave rights to his play Breaking of the Drought to Franklyn Barrett and Percy Rea.

The success of the film encouraged Dan Carroll to go into production and finance three more Baker movies.
