= Australia's Peril =

- Directed by: Franklyn Barrett
- Written by: Franklyn Barrett; J. Brown
- Produced by: Franklyn Barrett; Rock Phillips
- Starring: Roland Conway; Maie Baird
- Cinematography: Franklyn Barrett
- Release date: 19 May 1917
- Running time: 5 reels
- Country: Australia
- Languages: Silent film English intertitles

Australia's Peril is a 1917 Australian silent film directed by Franklyn Barrett. It is considered a lost film.

== Plot ==
Two German cruisers escape to the Pacific and begin to raid the Australian coast. They sink one merchant marine ship, leaving a sole survivor, Jack Rawson (Roland Conway). He drifts on a raft to an island which he discovers is an enemy munitions base and is captured. He overhears plans to raid the Australian coast and manages to escape. He is taken to Sydney but is kidnapped by a German spy, "Fred Smith" (John de Lacy). Smith ties Jack to a chair in a wooden building which he then sets on fire.

Smith helps a German raiding party land near Sydney and it starts wreaking havoc. Jack is rescued from the fire and helps fight the Germans, inspiring some workers who have gone on strike to join in the battle. He is stranded behind enemy lines when he discovers his fiancée, Marion (Maie Baird), is being held captive. He goes to rescue her and finds her being molested by Smith. Marion shoots Smith and kills him, then marries Jack.

== Cast ==
- Roland Conway as Jack Rawson
- Maie Baird as Marion Oldham
- John de Lacey as Frederich Schmidt / Fred Smith
- P.G. Sadler as Colonel Oldham
- Olga Willard-Turton as Joyce (credited as Olga Willard)
- Rock Phillips as Carl Reichardt
- Charles Villiers as Wilhelm Heidel
- Lily Rochefort as Aunt Lily
- Maud Styan as Maid
- Claude Turton
- Charles Beetham

== Chapter titles ==
1. Magnificent island scene
2. The raft at sea
3. The ride for life
4. The landing of the enemy
5. The sacking of the township
6. The massacre of inhabitants
7. The news reaches Sydney
8. Our troops to the rescue
9. The loyal strikers
10. The hand-to-hand fight
11. Victory.

== Production ==
The film was written by Barrett and Rock Phillips, a stage designer for J. C. Williamson Ltd who also appeared in the cast along with his wife Lily Rochefort.

Shooting began in early 1917 with the co-operation of the Commonwealth Defence Department and the New South Wales Recruiting Committee.

Charles Villiers was injured during the shoot when he fell down a 30-foot cliff. He was hospitalised for two weeks.

== Reception ==
According to one account, despite generally positive reviews, the film was not a success at the box office, most likely due to war weariness of the public.

However another account says the film played in cinema for two years.

Australian Photo Review wrote "Here is a film which, though a local production in every way, compares in technique particularly with the best of the foreign films, the photography in it being of an unusually high order."

== See also ==
- List of lost films
