= The Shepherd of the Southern Cross =

- Directed by: Alexander Butler
- Written by: Nell Shipman
- Produced by: Stanley Twist
- Starring: Arthur Shirley; Vera Pearce
- Cinematography: Ernest Higgins
- Production company: Australasian Films
- Release date: 13 June 1914
- Running time: 4,000 feet
- Country: Australia
- Languages: Silent film English intertitles

The Shepherd of the Southern Cross is a 1914 Australian silent film about an Englishwoman torn between two men. It was the first feature film produced by Australasian Films.

It is considered a lost film.

== Plot ==
Lady Helen Reynolds is forced to choose one of her two cousins to be her husband if she wants to inherit a large fortune. She chooses the villainous Ralph Hughes after he discredits the other option, Devon Collins.

Collins goes to Australia and becomes a shepherd. Some years later Lady Helen falls sick and is accompanied by her husband on a trip to Australia. While making the final stages of the journey in a coach they are held up by bushrangers. The husband and wife escape and get lost in the bush.

They wander around for days and become exhausted. Ralph leaves Helen for dead and winds up at the hut of his cousin, where he is taken in and revived by a girl who is actually his own daughter (the daughter of a previous marriage).

Lady Helen is discovered by Collins who takes her to the hut. Ralph admits his flaws and dies.

== Cast ==
- Arthur Shirley as Devon Collins
- Vera Pearce as Lady Helen Reynolds
- Roland Conway as Ralph Hughes
- Clare Stephenson as nurse
- Tien Hogue
- Shirley Huxley
- P. J. Noonan
- Mrs George Lauri – the widow of a top comedian, George Lauri, who knew Butler years ago

== Production ==
Australasian Films were reluctant to enter feature film production but were persuaded to do so by Cosens Spencer. Spencer imported the key creative talent: Stanley Twist and Nell Shipman were from Hollywood and Alexander Butler was established in British cinema. Shipman was only eighteen at the time. Butler had previously worked in Australia directing plays for J. C. Williamsons Ltd.

The actors were well established Australian stage performers. The lead female role was taken by Vera Pearce in her first film role. Mrs George Lauri was the widow of a comedian who Butler had worked with years before.

Raymond Longford was critical of the amount of time Butler spent filming, and said this caused the budget to increase.

== Reception ==
Critical response was mixed. The critic from The Referee said the film "placed Australian film production on a higher plane".

A critic from a Dubbo newspaper stated that the film:

Has done a deal of harm by representing to the untravelled young Sydneyites that the interior of the State is a vast, barren wilderness, where dust storms rage which bury man and beast, and have all the stifling and suffocating and poisonous effects of the African Simoom. But great as is the harm done by exhibiting this picture to Sydney youth, that harm is as a mere nothing compared to the false and harmful impressions that that would be created abroad. This film should be rigorously censored by the Government before it is released from Australia. Otherwise, it should be burnt by the common hangman.

The film was a financial failure, returning under £100 to Australasian Films. This led to them abandoning feature film production and Spencer resigned from the company he had helped establish.
