= A Silent Witness =

1912 Australian film by Franklyn Barrett

- Directed by: Franklyn Barrett
- Written by: Sydney Stirling
- Cinematography: Franklyn Barrett
- Production company: West's Pictures
- Release date: 22 May 1912
- Running time: 2,400 feet
- Country: Australia
- Languages: Silent film English intertitles

A Silent Witness is a 1912 Australian silent film directed by Franklyn Barrett. It is considered a lost film. It was a drama set in Sydney with Cyril Mackay as the hero.

Barrett later claimed this detective drama was the first production in which he had a "free hand".

Barrett referred later to making a film for Wests which dealt with opium smuggling and caused issues with the police. It may have been this movie.

Of Sydney Stirling, Barrett wrote "I never knew an actor so responsive to direction, so keen to size up a situation and command it.”

== Cast ==
- Cyril Mackay
- Irby Marshall
- Charles Lawrence
- Sydney Stirling
- Leonard Willey
- George Bryant
- Loris Brown
