= A Blue Gum Romance =

- Directed by: Franklyn Barrett
- Written by: Franklyn Barrett
- Starring: Tien Hogue
- Cinematography: Franklyn Barrett
- Production company: Fraser Film Release and Photographic Company
- Distributed by: Essanay Company (US)
- Release date: 19 May 1913
- Running time: 2,000 feet
- Country: Australia
- Languages: Silent film English intertitles

A Blue Gum Romance is a 1913 Australian silent film directed by Franklyn Barrett. It is considered a lost film.

== Plot ==
As described in a contemporary newspaper, Jim, skipper of a schooner, is in love with the daughter of a sawmill owner. Another admirer of the girl is George, foreman of the mills, and his attentions receive much more favour than those of Jim's. Jim concludes that the only way he can win the girl is by abducting her. With the assistance of his crew, he waylays George and carries off the girl. George is tied upon a log, and the steam saw is set in motion. Here he is left to his fate. Meanwhile the girl is placed in a boat, and taken to the schooner, which sets off at its full speed down the river. An old employee of the mill, to whom George had rendered kindnesses, goes to put up for the night close to the mill. It is not long before he hears the sound of the saw in motion, which is unusual at night. He rushes to the spot, and finds George faint with exhaustion still bound to log, with the saw within an inch or two of his head. He quickly applies the brake, stops the machinery, and releases George from his bonds. Directly on reviving, George, accompanied by a number of the mill hands, give chase after the schooner. They get into a motorboat, and race, at full speed after it. They overtake it, and a fierce fight ensues. The girl is rescued, and all ends happily.

== Cast ==
- Tien Hogue as heroine
- Tom Middleton as hero
- Douglas Lotherington as aboriginal chief

== Production ==
It was the first narrative film from the Fraser Film Release and Photographic Company.

The film was set in the timber industry area near Gosford and Woy Woy, although interiors were shot in Sydney. The aboriginal characters were played by white actors in blackface.

Filming was completed by July 1913.

== Reception ==
The film was popular at the local box office and screened in England and the US.

A contemporary review said the film "seemed to find favour with the spectators."

The film was picked up for distribution in the US by the Essanay Company and "met with success".
