= Ma Hogan's New Boarder =

- Directed by: Raymond Longford
- Written by: Raymond Longford
- Based on: story by A. Wright
- Produced by: Archie Fraser; Colin Fraser
- Starring: Charles Evans; Pearl Bambury
- Production company: Fraser Film Release and Photographic Company
- Release date: 1 July 1915
- Running time: 2,500 feet
- Country: Australia
- Languages: Silent film English intertitles

Ma Hogan's New Boarder was a 1915 film directed by Raymond Longford starring Charlie Chaplin impersonator Charles Evans. In the movie the lead "displays his antics and mannerisms."

It was one of Longford's few films not to feature Lottie Lyell and is considered a lost film.

== Cast ==
- C. Evans
- B Gilbert
- Q Cross
- E. Vockler

== Reception ==
Theatre managers offered to "supply cotton and buttons free to all patrons who damage them" during screenings of the film."

The Motion Picture News said that Charles Evans "gave a really clever impersonation of Charles Chaplin" but that "the production was too long to be anything more than ordinary."
