= W. S. Percy =

Australian stage comedian

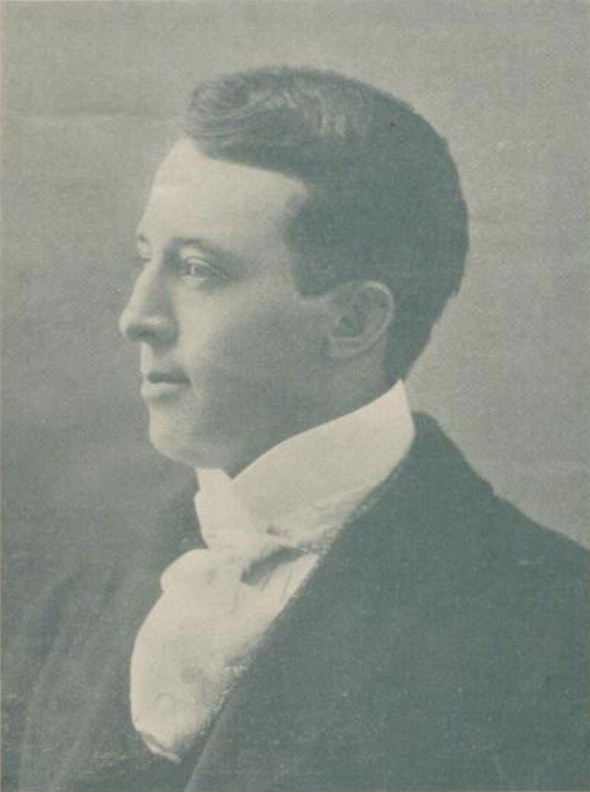
- Percy in Australia in 1906
- Born: William Stratford Percy; 1872; Australia
- Died: 1946 (aged 73–74); England, United Kingdom
- Occupations: Actor, comedian, writer

William Stratford Percy (1872–1946) was an Australian stage comedian who also appeared in a number of short films.

He made his reputation appearing in productions for J. C. Williamson Ltd. He co-starred in "The Girls of Gottenburg" and "The Dairymaids" with Reginald Roberts, Fanny Dango and George Lauri in Melbourne.

Percy left Australia in 1913 and appeared in a number of shows in the USA before heading to England.

Although he returned to Australia in the early 1920s to tour, he based the rest of his career in England.

In the late 1930s he started writing travel books.

== Select films ==
=== Percy Gets a Job ===
Percy Gets a Job is a 1912 Australian comedy short film starring Percy, at the time called "Australia's greatest comedian". It was one of the first Australian comedy short films. It was also known as Percy at the Lawyers and was released with another local short, Toggle Won't Go to School.

=== Percy's First Holiday ===
W.S. Percy later made another, more widely known short, Percy's First Holiday. In the short, Percy travels from Sydney to New York. He is thrown out of a cinema; fights a 16 stone actor for the privilege of playing the part of an attractive young lady's younger brother; treats a young girl to a plate of spaghetti in a tango restaurant; argues with her infuriated husband; is fleeced of every penny by race course crooks and has to work his way home as a steward. At the end he leans over the side of the vessel and says "I'm just crazy about America, but oh! I love Australia!"

Percy had left Australia for the US at the end of 1913. In February 1914 he arrived in New York and met Millard Johnson, the local representative of Union Theatres, who suggested he visit the Thanhouser Film Company Studio. They suggested Percy star in a comedy for the studio, and a scenario was written in 20 minutes. While in New York, Percy also appeared in the Broadway show Maid of Athens.

The film was supposedly only made for Australian consumption but ended up being released around the world. It was highly popular in Australia.

== Select credits ==
- All for Gold, or Jumping the Claim (1911) – original story
- Percy Gets a Job (1912) – short film
- Maid of Athens (1914) – Broadway show
- Percy's First Holiday (1914) – short film
- A Cold Doucho – theatre show
- Joyland – London Hippodrome
- Hijinks – tour over Briain
- Oh, Don't, Dolly (1919) – London Criterian
- The Girl for the Boy
- Medore
- Babes of the Wood (1922) – Australian pantomime
- Strolling Through Scotland (1934) -- book
- Strolling Through England (1935) – book
- Strolling through cottage England (1936) – book
