= Henry John Hayward =

Henry John Hayward (11 December 1865 – 21 August 1945) was a New Zealand theatrical company manager and cinema proprietor. He was born in Wolverhampton, Staffordshire, England on 11 December 1865.

He was a brother of Rudall Hayward ( – ), who with his wife Adelina Hayward, came to New Zealand in 1905. The two brothers were involved in entertainment and silent cinema in New Zealand and Australia, in West's Pictures and "The Brescians", a family of variety performers.

He was an uncle of Rudall Charles Victor Hayward MBE (4 July 1900 – 29 May 1974), a pioneer New Zealand filmmaker.
