= Tom Clayton (jockey) =

Australian jockey

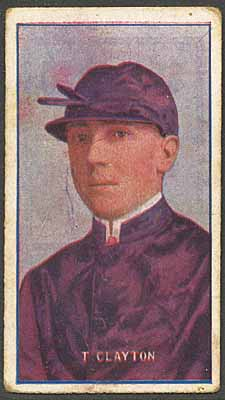
- Clayton on a 1908 cigarette card

Personal information
- Born: 1 December 1882 St Leonards, New South Wales; Australia
- Died: 24 March 1909 (aged 26) Parramatta, New South Wales
- Occupation: Jockey

Horse racing career
- Sport: Horse racing
- Career wins: unknown

Major racing wins
- Melbourne Cup (1904, 1906); Caulfield Cup (1906, 1907); AJC Derby (1906); Victoria Derby (1906); Melbourne Stakes (1907); AJC Plate (1908); Rawson Stakes (1908); Futurity Stakes (1908)

Significant horses
- Poseidon, Acrasia, Antonio
- Updated on 21 July 2007

Thomas Clayton (1 December 1882 – 24 March 1909) was an Australian jockey of the early 20th century.

== Early life ==
Clayton was born in St Leonards, New South Wales, a Sydney harbourside suburb on the north shore, to James Clayton and Alice (née Russell).

== Career ==
He was indentured to famous Randwick trainer Isaac Earnshaw and rode for him some of the best horses of the time. He was best known for his association with the champion Poseidon and accumulated an impressive record of major wins with this horse. Thanks to Poseidon, Clayton became the first jockey to win the Caulfield Cup-Melbourne Cup double in 1906. When Poseidon won the Caulfield Cup for a second time in 1907, Clayton became the first jockey to win consecutive Caulfield Cups.

== Melbourne and Caulfield Cups ==
Before teaming up with Poseidon, Clayton went close to winning the Cups double with Acrasia in 1904. Acrasia finished second in the Caulfield Cup, but went on to win the Melbourne Cup two weeks later. Courtesy of Warroo, Clayton achieved another second placing in the 1905 Caulfield Cup. Another of Clayton's major wins came in the 1908 Futurity Stakes on Antonio.

== Death ==
At 26 years of age, Clayton sustained a compound fracture of the pelvis, broken ribs and internal injuries when his mount "All Blue" was one of twelve horses to fall during the running of the Trial Stakes at Rosehill on 20 March 1909. He died as a result of these injuries on 24 March 1909.

== Legacy ==
On 24 March 2004 the presentation whips Clayton was given for his Melbourne Cup wins on Acrasia and Poseidon were sold at Public Auction in Victoria. The Acrasia whip was sold for $750 and the Poseidon whip was sold for $3,750 (figures in Australian dollars). After Tom's death, these whips had been passed in succession to his wife, Nellie, his daughter, Nellie Mary, and then his grandson.

== Sources ==
- Tom Clayton profile on Melbourne Cup Club website
- Futurity Stakes
- Melbourne Cup Previous Winners
