= Fraser Film Release and Photographic Company =

Australian film company

Fraser Film Release and Photographic Company was an Australian film company formed in 1912 by two brothers, Archie and Colin Fraser. It operated as a film exchange, importing movies from overseas, and production house, making shorts, features and documentaries.

Early financial support came from Giuseppe Borsalino, an Italian businessman who invested in Italian films and used Fraser Films as an Australia outlet for his company. Among the filmmakers who worked for them were Franklyn Barrett, Raymond Longford and Alfred Rolfe.

Despite some early successes, the company suffered from pressure exerted by the "combine" of Australasian Films and decline of production from Europe due to World War I where Fraser brought many of their films. The company had a bankruptcy hearing in 1918.

It was wound up in 1922. The company was formally liquidated in 1938.

== Select credits ==
- Whale Hunting in Jarvis Bay (1913) – documentary
- A Blue Gum Romance (1913) – feature
- The Life of a Jackeroo (1913) – feature
- The Silence of Dean Maitland (1914) – feature
- We'll Take Her Children in Amongst Our Own (1915) – short
- The Day (1914) – feature
- Ma Hogan's New Boarder (1915) – short
- The Unknown (1915)
- The Sunny South or The Whirlwind of Fate (1915) – feature
- Murphy of Anzac (1916) – feature
- film of Eugene Aram
