= Franklyn Barrett =

Australian film director and cinematographer

Walter Franklyn Barrett (1873 – 16 July 1964), better known as Franklyn Barrett, was an Australian film director and cinematographer. He worked for a number of years for West's Pictures. It was later written of the filmmaker that "Barrett's visual ingenuity was to be the highlight of all his work, but... his direction of actors was less assured".

== Early life and career ==
Barrett was born in Loughborough, Leicestershire, England, and was raised by his aunt. He was a professional violin player and amateur photographer and claims to have seen the first exhibit of motion pictures at the Empire Theatre in London.

Barrett moved to New Zealand with his brother and father to work as a clerk for the latter. He began to experiment with shooting movies, and in 1901 won a prize of £15 for some of his photos. Barrett accompanied the Duke of York on his 1901 tour of Australia in capacity as photographer. He worked for eight months with the Charles Urban Trading Co. Ltd in England. In New Zealand, Barrett made his first film, A Message from Mars.

== Australian career ==
Barrett moved to Australia in 1904, where he worked for several theatre companies. He was the first person to film the Melbourne Cup from start to finish in 1904, and shot several "scenic movies" for the New Zealand and New South Wales railways.

Barrett joined the Melbourne office of Pathé Frères in 1908. He toured through the South Pacific taking films for them. Barrett stayed with them when West's Pictures took over in 1911. He later wrote "After a period abroad as buyer, I decided that it was time to settle down. It was not the first time I had arrived at this decision and it certainly was not the last. I settled in on Australian dramas."

=== Drama director ===
In August 1911 Barrett returned to Australia from an overseas trip and decided to make drama films for Wests. He helped build their new studio. His first film for the company appears to have been a film of the stage play The Christian (1911) followed by All for Gold, or Jumping the Claim, although All for Gold was released first. Barrett said in October 1911, "I have had more pleasure in cinematographing All for Gold, for West's than in all the others [films he made] put together." Barrett continued to make documentary or scenic films for West's such as the 1911 Melbourne Cup. He made a series of thrillers for the company, often with the same cast: The Strangler's Grip (1912), The Mystery of the Black Pearl (1912), The Eleventh Hour (1912) and A Silent Witness (1913).

In 1913 West's merged with Australasian Films and Barrett joined the Fraser Film Release and Photographic Company, for whom he directed A Blue Gum Romance (1913) and The Life of a Jackeroo (1913). He also shot Pommy Arrives in Australia (1913) for director Raymond Longford. In December 1913 Barrett left on an overseas trip for two years.

Barrett returned to Australia in December 1915 having bought the rights to the novel The Pioneeers, which he then adapted into a film. He worked as a cinematographer on films such as The Joan of Arc of Loos (1916), Raymond Longford's The Mutiny of the Bounty (1916) and Jack Gavin's The Murder of Captain Fryatt (1917). Barrett intended to make a film with Dorothy Brunton but when she became unavailable obtained the rights to The Monk and the Woman (1917). He made the war film Australia's Peril (1917) and shot footage for A Romance of the Burke and Wills Expedition of 1860 (1918).

Barrett was cinematographer (and possibly uncredited director) on the first two movies from Snowy Baker, The Enemy Within (1918) and The Lure of the Bush (1918), co producing the latter. Around this time he and the author of "Lure of the Bush", Percy Reay, registered for copyright "The Adventures of Barry Lupino Detective". He directed the film adaptation Struck Oil (1919) of the stage hit.

In 1920 he was part of the Golden Wattle Film Syndicate which made the film adaptation of the stage success The Breaking of the Drought, written by Reay and directed by Barrett. Barrett then formed his own film company with solicitor Barry Kenward, with whom he made three features: A Girl of the Bush (1921), Know Thy Child (1921) and A Rough Passage (1922). This company folded in May 1922.

=== Later career ===
Barrett moved into theatre management, running the Capitol Theatre in Canberra in 1925, then various cinemas for Hoyts Theatres from 1927 onwards. In the mid 1920s he was associated with the Australian Motion Picture Producers Association. He spoke in support of the local industry and in 1925 expressed interest in some projects he still wished to make but these were never filmed. In 1930 Barrett wrote, "the value of Australian-made pictures lies in the fact that they must be different. Point for point, we cannot hope' to compete with the splendid productions w" are receiving from across the Pacific Ocean...But if we stick to the type of dhat,. isnatural to us, comparisons cannot be-made' and we have a big chance of interesting the overseas market."

In 1936 Barrett was working as an exhibitor. A trade paper called him "A cheerful personality... a man who thoroughly knows his job, and one who could reca11 many interesting reminiscences about anything or anybody associated with the picture business in Australia."

He died at Randwick, New South Wales on 16 July 1964, and was cremated.

== Personal life ==
Born Walter Franklyn Brown, son of William Brown and Matilda, née Hopwell, Barrett was already a widower by the time he married Mabel Muriel Pile in Perth on 10 December 1906. She predeceased him but the daughter they had together, Harrie "Todds" Barrett, survived him. Todds Barrett went on to become a successful businesswoman.

Franklyn and Mabel's house at 6 Barrett Place Randwick, their home from 1911 to 1926, has a Bicentennial commemorative plaque.

== Select filmography ==
- Dummy Mace (1901) – cinematographer, director – a staged 3 round boxing match
- A Message from Mars (1903) – cinematographer, director
- Ally Sloper as a conjuror (1903) – cinematographer, director
- Ally Sloper on Holiday (1903) – cinematographer, director
- Ally Sloper at the Races (1903) – cinematographer, director
- The Melbourne Cup (1904) – cinematographer, director
- The Sea Coasts of New Zealand (1908) – cinematographer
- The Christian (1911) – cinematographer, director
- All for Gold, or Jumping the Claim (1911) – cinematographer, director
- Sirens of the Surf (1911) (documentary)
- Johnson's Juggernauts (1912) (short)
- The Strangler's Grip (1912) – cinematographer
- The Mystery of the Black Pearl (1912) – cinematographer
- The Eleventh Hour (1912) – cinematographer
- A Silent Witness (1912) – cinematographer, director
- The Life of a Jackeroo (1913) – cinematographer, director
- Pommy Arrives in Australia (1913) – cinematographer
- A Blue Gum Romance (1913) – cinematographer, director
- The Pioneers (1916) – cinematographer, director
- The Joan of Arc of Loos (1916) – cinematographer
- The Mutiny of the Bounty (1916) – cinematographer
- The Murder of Captain Fryatt (1917) – cinematographer
- The Monk and the Woman (1917) – director
- Australia's Peril (1917) – cinematographer, director
- The Enemy Within (1918) – cinematographer
- A Romance of Burke and Wills Expedition of 1860 (1918) – cinematographer
- The Lure of the Bush (1918) – cinematographer
- Struck Oil (1919) – director
- The Breaking of the Drought (1920) – cinematographer, director
- A Girl of the Bush (1921) – cinematographer, director
- Know Thy Child (1921) – cinematographer, director
- A Rough Passage (1922) – cinematographer, director
