= Acrasia (horse) =

Australian-bred Thoroughbred racehorse

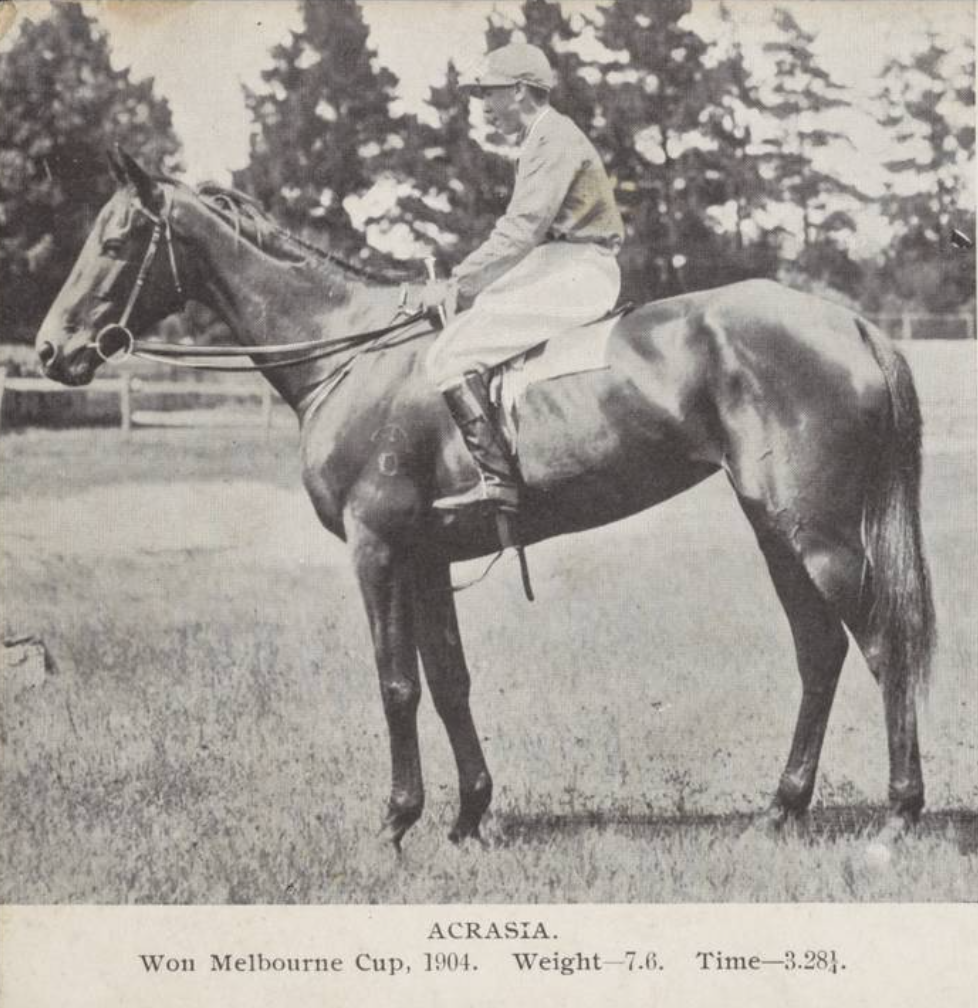
- Sire: Gozo
- Grandsire: Wild Oats
- Dam: Cerise and Blue
- Damsire: Wilberforce
- Sex: Mare
- Foaled: 1897
- Owner: Humphrey Oxenham

Major wins
- Melbourne Cup (1904)

Acrasia (foaled 1897) was an Australian racehorse that won the 1904 Melbourne Cup.

== Racing career ==
Bred and owned by bookmaker Humphrey Oxenham, Acrasia finished fourth in the 1902 Melbourne Cup.

She was ridden by jockey Tom Clayton and carried 7 st. 6 lbs. (47.17 kg) to win the 1904 Melbourne Cup as a seven-year-old at odds of 14/1. She was the only filly or mare in the field. In doing so she became the third mare to win in the first 44 runnings of the race.

In Spring carnival leading up to the Cup, she had finished second in the Spring Cup at Sandown Park and also in the Coongy Handicap and Caulfield Cup.

Her owner, Humphrey Oxenham, was a bookmaker who, while playing poker, staked her and lost ownership to John Mayo. He bought her back the following day and owned her at the time of her win.

== Pedigree ==
Pedigree of Acrasia
Sire Gozo	Wild Oats (GB)	Wild Dayrell	Ion
Sire Gozo	Wild Oats (GB)	Wild Dayrell	Ellen Middleton
Sire Gozo	Wild Oats (GB)	The Golden Horn	Harkaway (IRE)
Sire Gozo	Wild Oats (GB)	The Golden Horn	Little Red Rover mare
Sire Gozo	Maltese Cross (GB)	Oxford	Birdcatcher (IRE)
Sire Gozo	Maltese Cross (GB)	Oxford	Honey Dear
Sire Gozo	Maltese Cross (GB)	Valetta	Stockwell
Sire Gozo	Maltese Cross (GB)	Valetta	Meeanne
Dam Cerise and Blue	Wilberforce (GB)	Oxford	Birdcatcher (IRE)
Dam Cerise and Blue	Wilberforce (GB)	Oxford	Honey Dear
Dam Cerise and Blue	Wilberforce (GB)	Corsica	Newminster
Dam Cerise and Blue	Wilberforce (GB)	Corsica	Pauline
Dam Cerise and Blue	Myrtle	(unnamed)	Gemma di Vergy (GB)
Dam Cerise and Blue	Myrtle	(unnamed)	Mainstay (GB)
Dam Cerise and Blue	Myrtle	Countess	Pitsford (GB)
Dam Cerise and Blue	Myrtle	Countess	Sailor mare
