= The Sunny South or The Whirlwind of Fate =

The Sunny South, or The Whirlwind of Fate
- Directed by: Alfred Rolfe
- Written by: Johnson Weir or George Darrell
- Based on: play The Sunny South by George Darrell
- Produced by: Archie Fraser; Colin Fraser
- Starring: Charles Villers
- Production company: Fraser Film Release and Photographic Company
- Distributed by: Fraser Film Release and Photographic Company
- Release date: 1 February 1915
- Running time: 3,000 feet (three reels)
- Country: Australia
- Languages: Silent film English intertitles

The Sunny South, or the Whirlwind of Fate is a 1915 Australian silent film directed by Alfred Rolfe based on the popular play The Sunny South by George Darrell. It is considered a lost film.

== Cast ==
- Charles Villiers

== Characters ==
- Matt Morley/Morley Chester
- Worthy Chester
- Clarice Chester
- Ivo Chester
- Bertha/Bubs Berkley
- Plantageant Smiffers
- Rebecca Hann
- Eli Grup
- Perfidy Pounce
- Ben Brewer
- Dick Duggan
- Black Steve
- Sergeant Swoop
- Monte Jack
- Jinks
- Bank Teller True

== Play ==
The Sunny South
- Original language: English
- Written by: George Darrell
- Genre: Melodrama

Premiere
- Date: 30 March 1883
- Place: Prince of Wales Opera House Melbourne

Darrell's play premiered in 1883 and was a massive success. Darrell himself performed in it over 1,500 times. It was one of a series of melodramas Darrell wrote in his career.

=== Plot ===
In an English country mansion lives Worthy Chester, his daughter Clarice and nephew Ivo Carew. Worthy Chester is in debt to a money lender, Eli Grup, who threatens Chester with ruin unless Clarice marries him. Clarice and Ivo are in love with each other but neither has any money.

An old friend of the family, Matt Morley, returns from Australia. He reveals himself to be Morley Chester, the long supposed dead son and heir to the late owner of the estate, and claims ownership of the property.

A telegram arrives from Bubs Berkely, Morley's adopted daughter, indicating the discovery of gold in Australia. Morley and Bubs sail for Australia to find gold to save the family property; Clarice and Ivo Carew come with them.

Morley's friend Ben Brewer discovers a £5,000 gold nugget on Morley's El Dorado claim. It is placed in a local bank stood up by Dick Duggan, bushranger. Duggan is defeated in a massive fight and the nugget is recovered. Duggan is jailed, but escaped.

Perfidy Pounce, a lawyer who works for Eli Grup and has come to Australia upon his employer's wishes, arranges for Duggan to kill Morley, but later has a change of heart and betrays Duggan and Grup to Morley and company. Duggan kidnaps Bubs and imprisons her in a hut. He then captures Morley who has come to rescue her and ties him to a tree. He threatens to use Morley as a target for pistol practice unless Morley gives him a thousand pounds (£1,000) and Bubs marries him. Both refuse.

The police attack the gang in their hideout. The hut is burned down and Morley and Bobs are rescued but Duggan and his men escape.

Duggan and his gang plan to hold up the Zig Zag Railway train on the Blue Mountains. It is carrying Morley, Bubs, their friends and the gold to Sydney. However the bushrangers are defeated. Bubs marries (her adoptive father) Morley and Clarice and Ivo are also married.

== Production ==
The film was the second Rolfe directed for the Fraser Film Release and Photographic Company. Rolfe had appeared in several of Darrell's plays as an actor.

According to the Referee "the cast was chosen from some of the most popular thespians in Australia. No expense was spared in producing both the comedy and drama on a scale comparing favorably with American offerings."

The film was shot on location at Frenchs Forest in late 1914.

A riot scene was shot at Manly Beach, involving a large number of extras carrying firearms and other weapons. According to star Charles Villiers:

All went well for a few moments, and then a military patrol swooped down and held up the show. Expostulations were useless. We were evidently up to some mischief, and the military men were determined to stop it. Perhaps they thought we were, a party of Germans having our morning strafe. So we were all duly lined up against a nearby fence while some soldiers set about disarming us. A closer view of the weapons, however, satisfied the officer in charge that we were harmless, and the 'riot' came off without further interruption.

On 10 January 1915 it was announced the film was "just completed".

== Release ==
The movie was released with two supporting films from Fraser, We'll Take her Children in amongst our own (1915, directed by Raymond Longford), and The Unknown (1915, directed by J. E. Mathews).

Contemporary advertising for the film stated that:

A feature of the picture is the restraint exhibited by the author in dealing with the most exciting series of incidents, the Australian characteristics having been sustained throughout and the interest preserved without resource to the lurid sensationalism which is the mark of many imported films.
