= The Foreign Legion =

1928 film by Edward Sloman

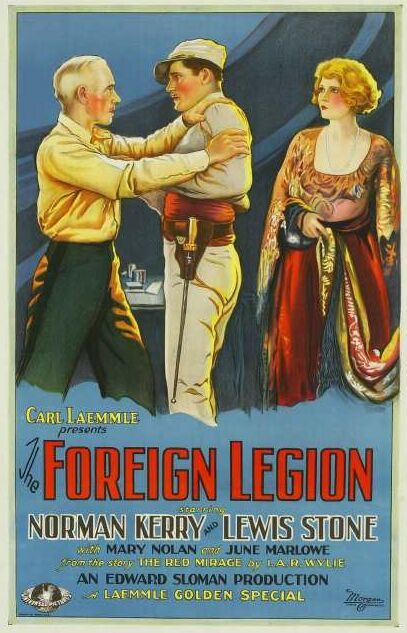
- Poster
- Directed by: Edward Sloman
- Written by: Jack Jarmuth; Charles Kenyon
- Based on: The Red Mirage by I.A.R. Wylie
- Starring: Norman Kerry; Lewis Stone; Mary Nolan
- Cinematography: Jackson Rose
- Edited by: Ted J. Kent
- Production company: Universal Pictures
- Distributed by: Universal Pictures
- Release date: June 23, 1928
- Running time: 80 minutes
- Country: United States
- Language: Silent (English intertitles)

The Foreign Legion is a 1928 American silent adventure film directed by Edward Sloman and starring Norman Kerry, Lewis Stone, and Mary Nolan. The film is based on the 1913 novel The Red Mirage by I.A.R. Wylie. It was one of several Foreign Legion-themed films produced in the wake of the successful 1926 film Beau Geste. The production cost around $250,000, but was the subject of diplomatic protests from French authorities due to its depiction of brutality.

== Cast ==
- Norman Kerry as Richard Farquhar
- Lewis Stone as Col. Destin
- Crauford Kent as Capt. Arnaud
- Mary Nolan as Sylvia Omney (credited as Imogene Robertson)
- June Marlowe as Gabrielle
- Walter Perry as Cpl. Gotz
- Billy Seay as Richard as a Boy (uncredited)

== Preservation ==
With no prints of The Foreign Legion located in any film archives, it is a lost film.

== Bibliography ==
- Vasey, Ruth. "Beyond Sex and Violence," in Schatz, Thomas (ed.), Hollywood: Social Dimensions: Technology, Regulation and the Audience, Vol. III (2004). Routledge: Taylor & Francis Group. ISBN 0-415-28134-2
