= Mines of Gorno =

Zinc mines in northern Italy

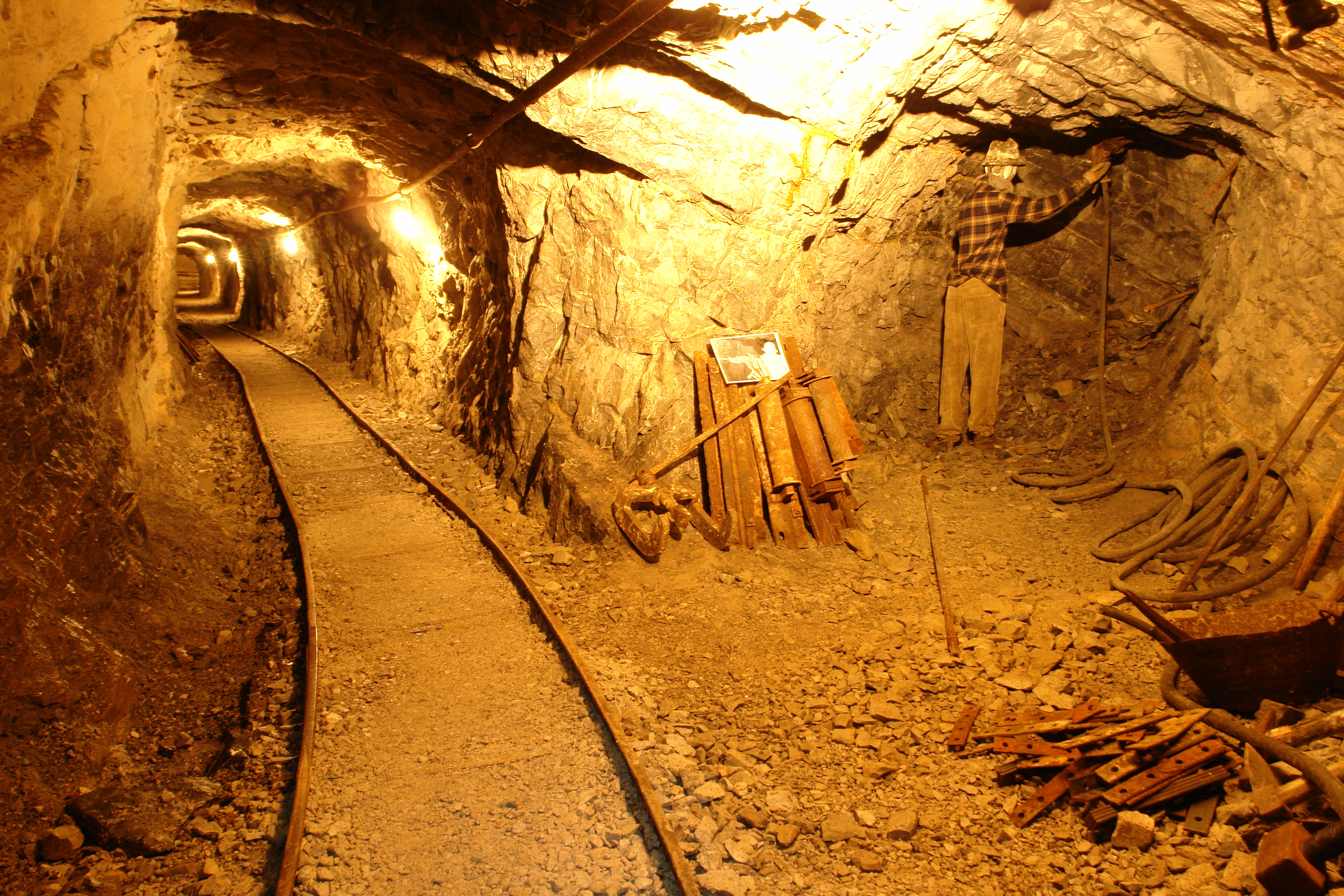
- "Serpenti" entrance to the mines of Gorno

- Location of the town of Gorno, where the mines are situated, on a map of Italy.
- Location: Gorno, Province of Bergamo, Lombardy, Italy; 45°52′12″N 9°49′42″E
- Products: Zinc, Lead, Silver
- Type: Underground mine
- Discovered: Roman period (early workings)
- Opened: c. 1850 (industrial exploitation)
- Closed: 1982
- Website: https://www.ecomuseominieredigorno.it/ Ecomuseo Miniere di Gorno

The mines of Gorno are a historical mining district located in Gorno, in the Lombardy region of northern Italy. The mines operated from Roman times until the late 20th century, producing blende, calamine and galena, minerals primarily used to extract zinc. They are reported to have been visited by Leonardo da Vinci in his role as an engineer of the Venetian Republic. For centuries, they played a significant role in the economy and social life of the Riso Valley, involving entire families of miners, the taissine and the galecc.

The mines were permanently closed in 1982 following a decline in productivity. Since 2009, the Gorno Mining Ecomuseum has preserved and promoted the heritage of the mining community, exhibiting work tools, mineralogical finds, and historical documents.

== Location ==
The Gorno mining district lies in the upper Val del Riso, a lateral branch of the Seriana Valley in the Bergamo Alps, within the Province of Bergamo in Lombardy. The mines extend across several hamlets, including Costa Jels, Campello and Riso, at altitudes ranging between 700 and 1,200 meters. The surrounding mountain landscape contains traces of industrial activity, such as ventilation shafts, stone walls, and mule tracks once used by miners.

The area is accessed from Bergamo via Val Seriana through the SP46 road, via the towns of Clusone and Ponte Nossa.

== History ==
The earliest evidence of Roman mining activity in the area is dated to c.30 AD. The Romans used "calamine" (oxidized zinc minerals) ores to manufacture aurichalcum, a brass-like alloy, by combining copper and calamine. Since metallic zinc had not yet been chemically isolated, they employed a process known as cementation: copper was heated with crushed calamine and charcoal, allowing the zinc vapor released from the ore to be absorbed directly by the copper.

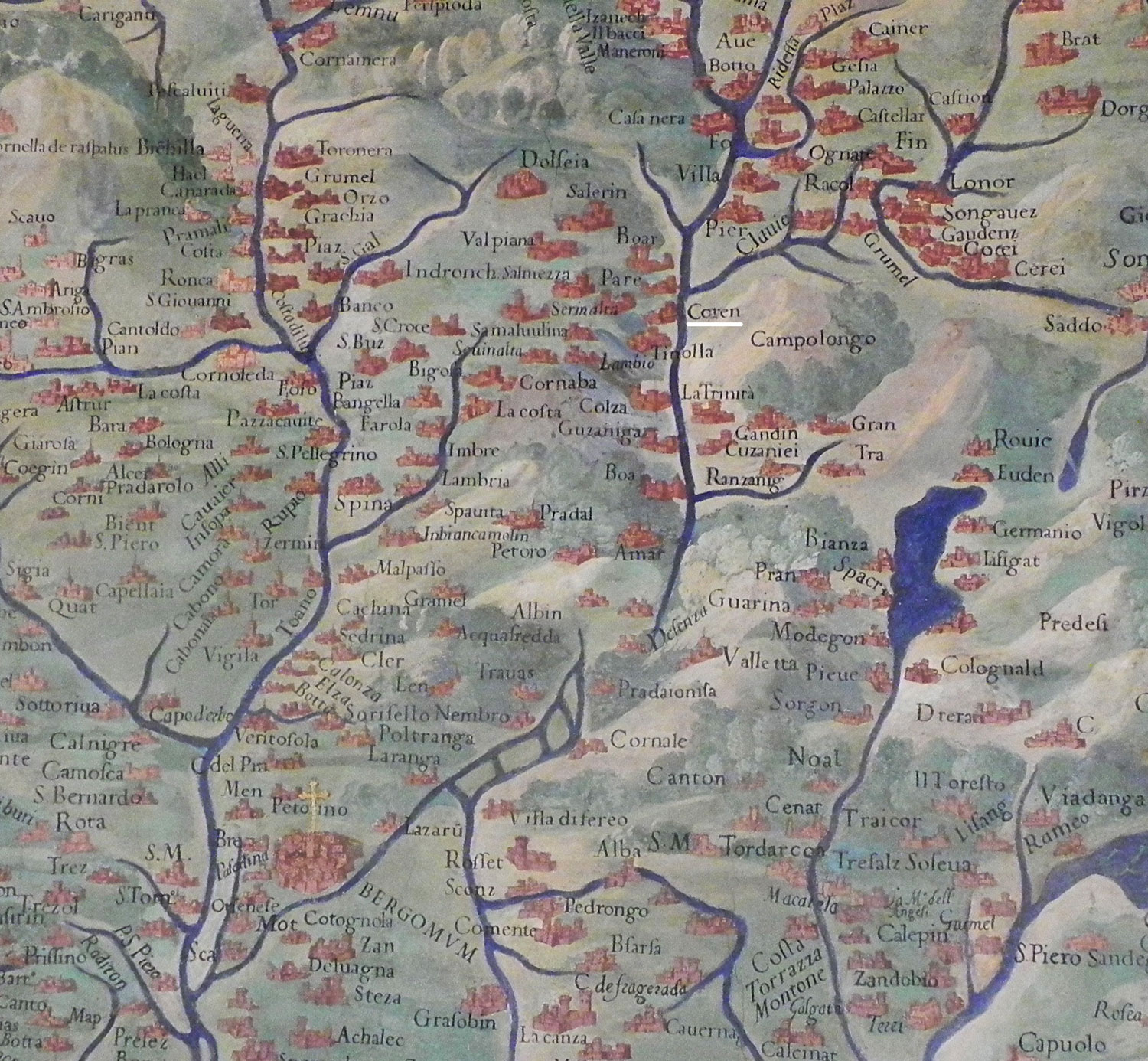
Map of the province of Bergamo, Northern Italy (Gorno is underlined in white), from the Vatican museum dated 1580.

Following the decline of the Roman Empire, specific information about the mines is scarce until the late medieval period. Starting in 1482, the mines were reactivated under a decree by the Republic of Venice. The Venetians were primarily interested in extracting silver from galena, but this endeavor was soon discontinued due to the poor yield.

There is evidence that Leonardo da Vinci visited the mines in his capacity as a government engineer between 1506 and 1507. As a proof of his presence in the area, a drawing attributed to him, depicting Mount Arera, is currently preserved in the Royal Collection in London.

In the mid-19th century, the industrial extraction of calamine officially began, peaking after 1870. Mining progress was initially hindered by expensive and inefficient transportation. The completion of the railway between Bergamo and Ponte-Selva in 1885 significantly reduced ore transport costs.

During World War II, the mines were taken over by Italian firms, but operations ceased in 1945-46 due to technical and financial issues. In 1952, activity resumed with the opening of the largest electrolytic zinc plant in Europe nearby, which produced between 15,000 and 35,000 tons of zinc annually. Modern underground operations at Gorno were administered by the Italian state after the Law Decree No. 103/1977 (Decreto Legge n.103 of 1977). In 1978 SAMIM S.p.A. was founded under the control of the Italian State hydrocarbon authority (ENI) and it administered the mines during intermittent operation from 1981 until their official closure in 1982. The cessation of mining activities led to a period of economic depression for the local population, which subsequently prompted the initiation of a project for the designation of the mining sites into a cultural heritage asset.

== Geology ==
The Gorno area features carbonate formations of the Mesozoic period, which originated as an ancient seabed and now hosts zinc and lead mineralization.

The geological formations exposed in the area mainly consist of Lower Triassic to Carnian carbonate successions. These include the Angolo Limestone, Prezzo Limestone, Esino Limestone, Calcare Rosso, Breno Formation, Calcare Metallifero Bergamasco (CMB) Formation, and the Gorno Formation, followed by the San Giovanni Bianco and Dolomia Principale formations.

The mineral deposits are hosted primarily within the Calcare Metallifero Bergamasco Formation and, locally, in the underlying Breno Formation. The CMB Formation is composed of dark limestones with marly interbeds.

The ore bodies of Gorno extend between the Seriana and Brembana valleys over an area of roughly 30 km east-west and 20 km north-south. The main mineralized zones are located in Val Vedra, Val Parina, Mount Arera, and Val Riso, Mount Trevasco. Zinc-lead mineralization occur as stratiform bodies near the contact between the CMB and the basal shales of the Gorno Formation, as well as in discordant bodies within the Breno limestones.

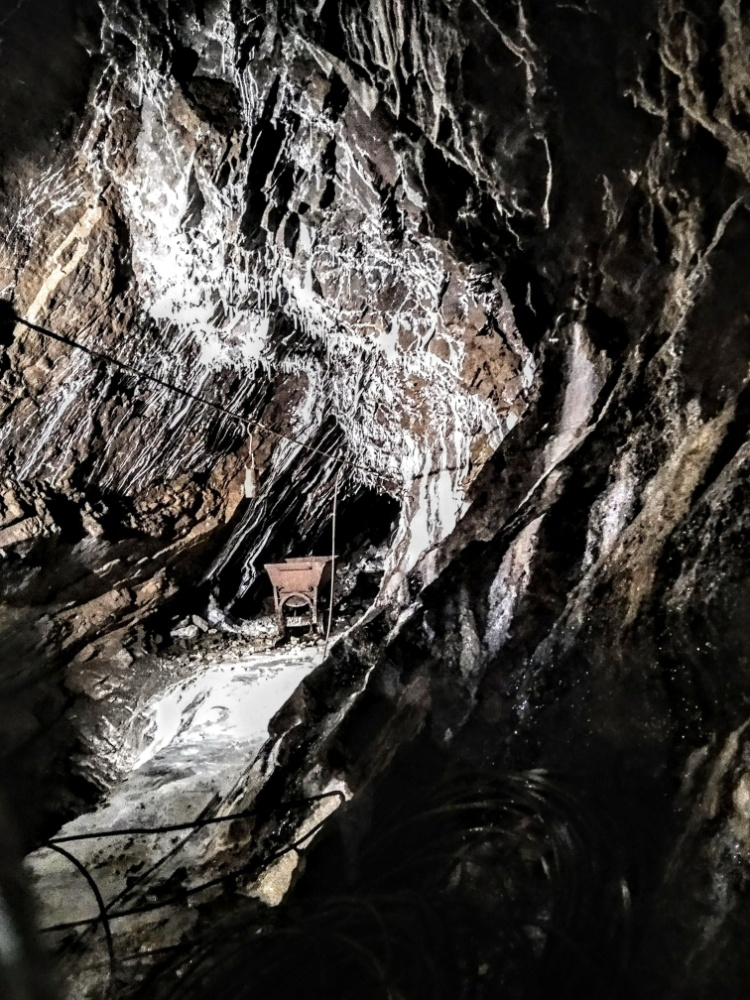
Interior of the Costa Jels mine showing white mineral formations on the rock walls and a preserved mine cart. Gorno, Northern Italy.

Structurally, the deposits are affected by several faults, including the Pian Bracca thrust, the Pezzel fault, and the Vedra fault, which define and offset the orebodies. The main ore zones, such as Zorzone, Val Vedra, and Fontanone ore bodies, are interpreted as belonging to the same mineralized system displaced by these fault structures. Since the mineralization is located within carbonate rocks (limestone and dolomite), the geological setting is subject to karst phenomena. The underground excavations frequently intersected natural caverns, voids, and water channels, which historically posed significant drainage challenges for the mining operations.

The mineralization consists of zinc and lead sulfides, mainly sphalerite and galena, with minor pyrite and chalcopyrite, formed within Triassic limestones and shales. A distinctive feature of the Gorno district is the abundance of low-iron sphalerite crystals. Unlike the dark, iron-rich varieties found elsewhere, the sphalerite here often appears translucent with colors ranging from yellow to amber-hazelnut. Locally known as "honey blende" (blenda mielata), this variety is highly prized by mineral collectors. These are accompanied by carbonate gangue minerals such as calcite and dolomite. The sulfide ores were later oxidized to nonsulfide minerals, chiefly smithsonite, hydrozincite, hemimorphite, and cerussite, often replacing the primary sulfides.

The Gorno deposit is classified as an "Alpine-type" carbonate-hosted zinc-lead deposit, comparable to others found along the Alpine chain such as Raibl, Salafossa, and Bleiberg. The sulfide mineralization likely formed from hydrothermal fluids circulating through Mesozoic faults during the Early to Middle Jurassic, before the Alpine orogeny. The later nonsulfide ores developed during supergene alteration between the Miocene and Pliocene, associated with the exhumation of the Orobic Alps and a warmer paleoclimate.

== Production and operators ==
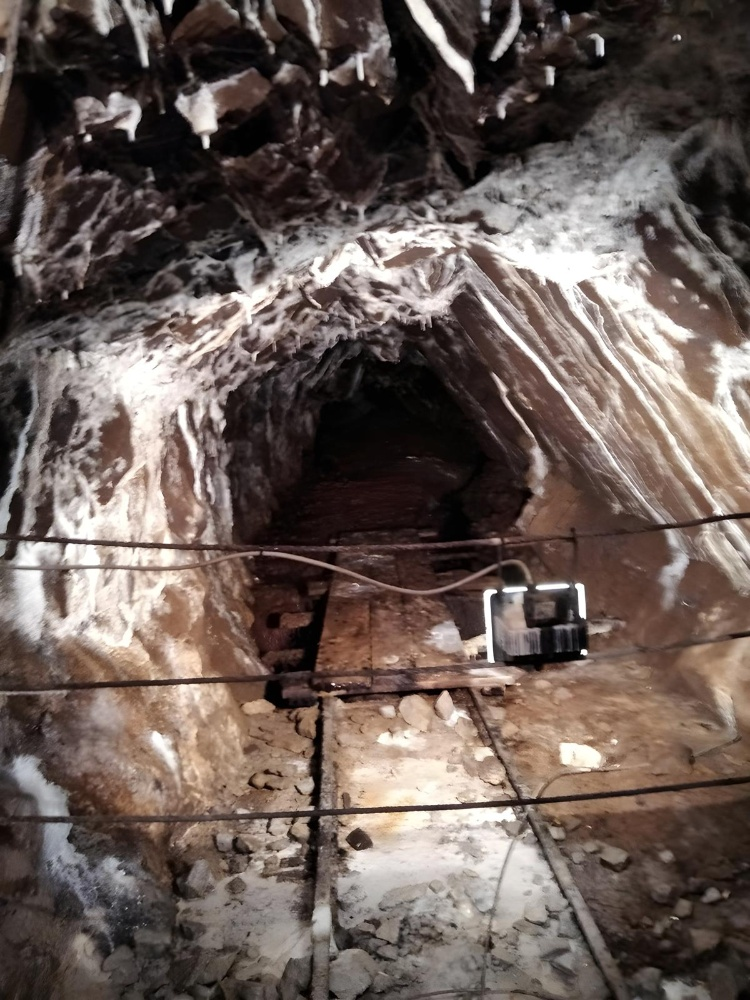
Underground tunnel in the Mines of Gorno, Italy, equipped with railway tracks for transporting ore to the surface.

Mining took place in deep, humid, and poorly lit tunnels, initially using manual equipment and later explosives. The Costa Jels Mine complex comprised over 200 km of tunnels used for the extraction and transportation of minerals. Due to the rugged topography of the mountainous area, the transportation of ore from the extraction sites to the processing plants relied on an extensive network of aerial tramways. Historical analysis of the mining diagrams from the Campello di Gorno administrative center indicates that the district was covered by approximately 23 kilometers (14 mi) of ropeways.

These systems connected the various tunnel entrances, located at higher altitudes (such as the Costa Jels, Plassa, and Val Vedra sites), directly to the washeries (laverie) situated on the valley floor, specifically in Val del Riso and Oneta. The majority of these ropeways were gravity-powered (technically known as automotrici or jig-back systems). They operated without external motors, utilizing the potential energy of the heavy, ore-filled buckets descending to pull the empty buckets back up to the mine entrances. This network remained the primary method of logistical support for the mines unitl their closure in the 1980s.

After the cessation of state-run operations in the 1980s, the Gorno mininig district was re-evaluated for its remaining zinc and lead resources. According to a technical review by Snowden Optiro, the area was one of the most productive non-ferrous metal districts in Lombardy throughout the twentieth century, with extensive underground workings following stratiform ore bodies rich in sphalerite and galena.

Recent geological mapping and sampling campaigns have confirmed the presence of several hundred thousand tonnes of mineralization still accessible within historic mining levels. These modern studies have combined archival mine data with geophysical surveys to assess the potential for sustainable redevelopment of parts of the old mine system.

The current operator, Altamin Limited, continues exploration within the historical concessions, using modern survey methods and environmental standards to evaluate the district's remaining economic potential.

Academic studies have also been conducted on the district, such as a thesis from the Politecnico di Torino, which assessed historical mining techniques and confirmed the presence of sphalerite and galena in the ore bodies.

== Gorno Project ==
Since 2021, interest developed in redeveloping parts of the former mining district under the name Gorno Project. The aim is to leverage the existing underground infrastructure and known mineralization to restart mining operations. The site includes more than 20 km of existing primary underground development already in place, which can facilitate exploration and eventual extraction.

The Energia Minerals Italia (EMI) company conducted an exploration in September 2021 that identified unextracted raw ores ranging between 17.4 and 22.0 million tonnes. The composition is primarily zinc (8.5% - 10.4%), lead (1.9% - 2.4%), and silver (19 g/t - 23 g/t). The mineral site of Punta Corna is also being considered for the extraction of cobalt.

Vedra Metals is a joint venture between Altamin and the Capital Advisory Plan aimed at redeveloping the mining at Gorno.

== Workers ==
=== The miners ===
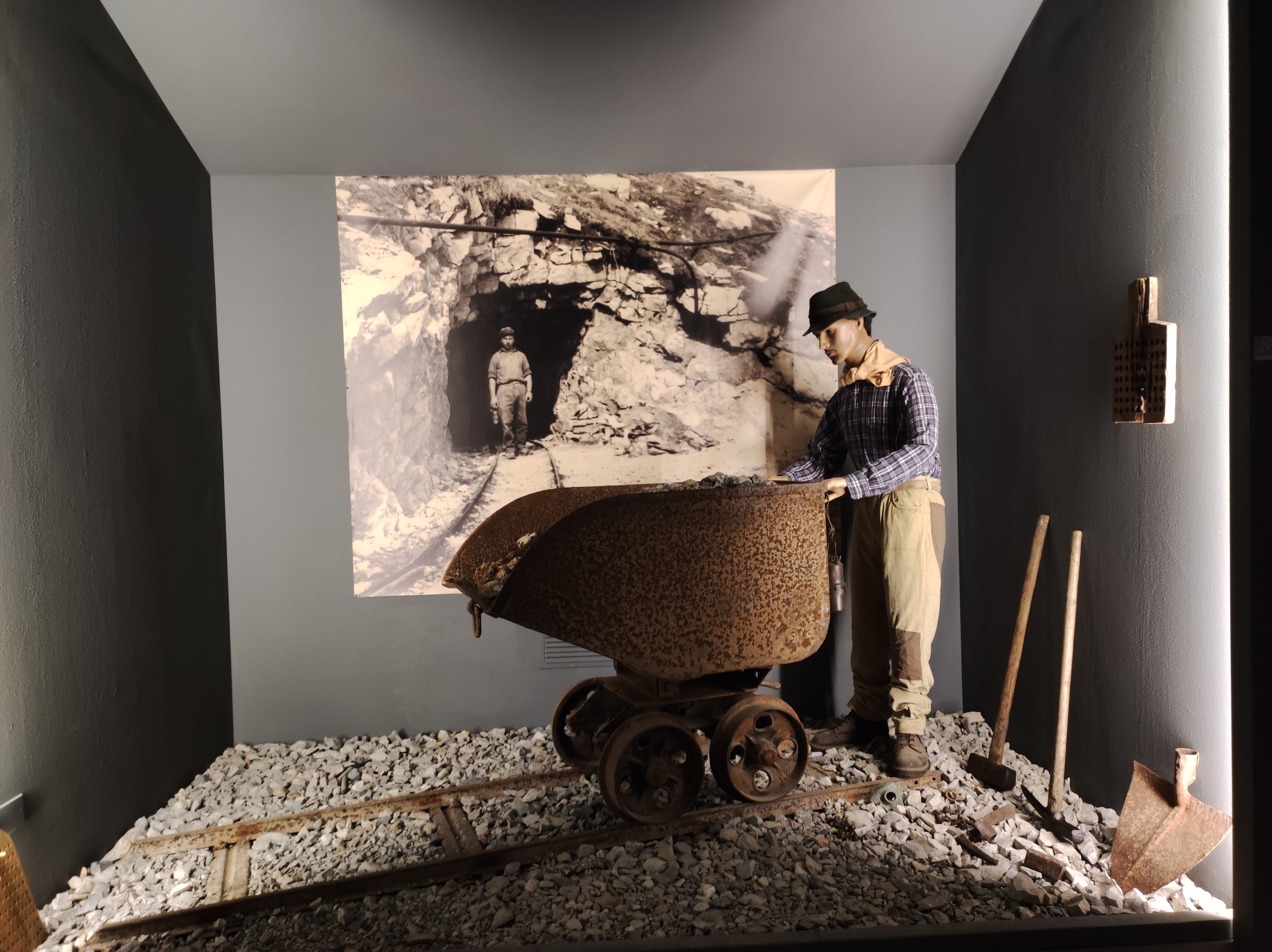
Model of a miner with an ore cart used in the Gorno zinc-lead mines, in the Ecomuseum of the Mines of Gorno.

Historically the mine workers inherited their occupation from older family members. Workers used torches and lanterns as a source of light and pickaxes and sledgehammers to extract the ores. In more modern times they were equipped with a helmet and acetylene lamp. Their work included clearing the tunnel ceilings of loose stones, preparing places for explosives and loading the carts that led out of the mines.

Many tasks were split among specialized roles, including the caporàl (foreman), the foghì (responsible for detonating fuses), the vagonésta (who drove the wagons inside the mine), the strusì (who guided wagons down to the valley), the frenòr (who braked the wagons), the taissine, and the galecc.

=== The taissine ===
The taissine, whose name derives from the technical verb "taissare" (partition or disjoin), were women who worked on the surface and were responsible for sorting minerals from dirt and other impurities. They needed physical strength both for using a special hammer and for transporting the materials. Boys under ten often assisted them with sorting. Reports on the health conditions of the taissine included the presence of a reddish halo on their gums due to direct contact with lead.

=== The galecc ===
The galecc were young apprentices, often boys or teenagers, employed primarily for the manual transport of ore. Before the widespread introduction of rail tracks and carts, they carried the material from the extraction face to the main collection points using heavy wicker panniers (known locally as gerle) on their shoulders. Their smaller stature allowed them to navigate the narrowest and lowest tunnels where adult miners or mules could not easily operate. The working conditions were physically demanding, characterized by darkness, high humidity, and a constant temperature between 10 and 12 °C (50–54 °F).

== The Ecomuseum ==
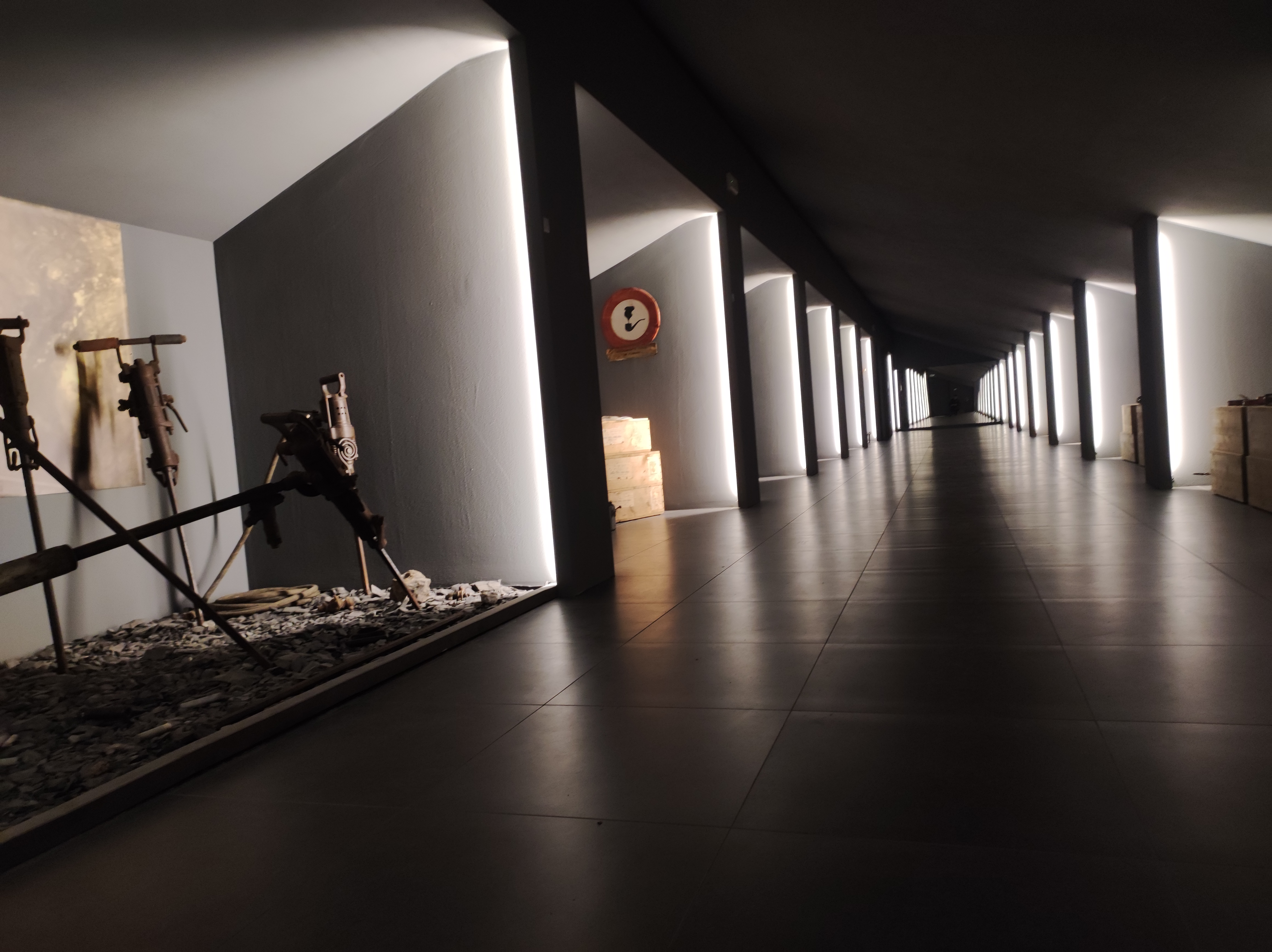
Interior of the Ecomuseum of the Mines of Gorno, Lombardy, Italy.

After the closure of the mines in the early 1980s, local authorities and former miners promoted the preservation of the mining district as a cultural and educational site. This led to the foundation of the Ecomuseum of the Mines of Gorno, which preserves the region’s mining legacy through the conservation of original tools, documents, and underground galleries such as in the Costa Jels mine. In 2009, the site was officially recognized by the Lombardy Region as an ecomuseum territory, acknowledging its cultural and environmental importance within the broader Alpine mining landscape. The initiative forms part of a regional network of ecomuseums created to preserve Lombardy’s industrial and mountain heritage.

The site includes a museum and the remains of aerial ropeways, rail tracks, a section of tunnels and ore chutes that once served the Costa Jels mine.

== Places of interest ==
=== Costa Jels ===
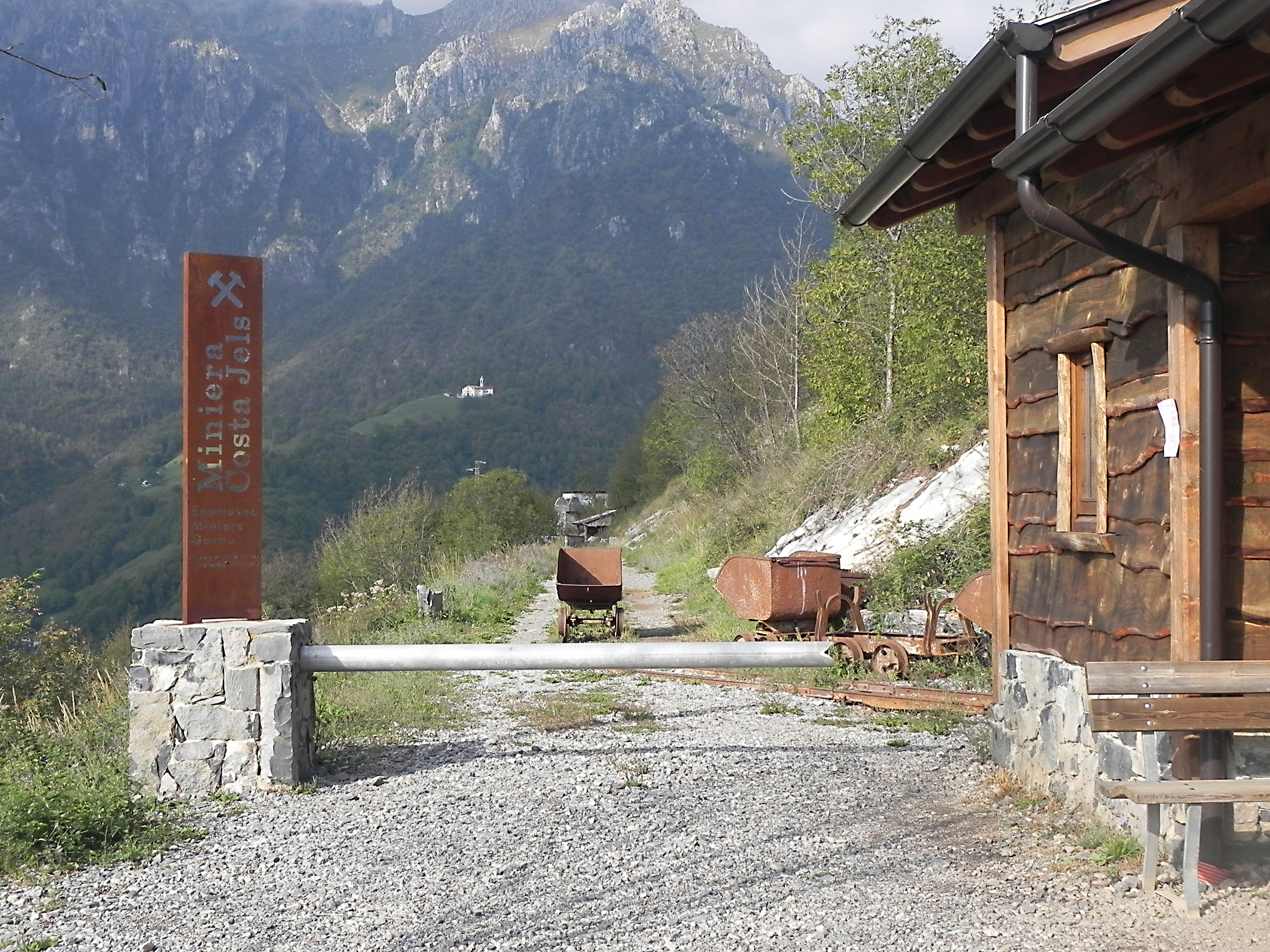
Entrance to the path leading to the Costa Jels mining site, Gorno, Italy.

Costa Jels is a historic mining site located in the municipality of Gorno. The area preserves remains and infrastructure related to ancient mining activities, including tunnels, cableways, tracks, and hoppers. Costa Jels is recognized as part of Gorno’s historic mining heritage and can be visited as part of the Gorno Mines Ecomuseum.

=== Laveria di Riso ===
The "Laveria di Riso" was an industrial facility where minerals extracted from mines, such as Costa Jels or the Riso Gallery, were processed. The plant's primary function was to increase the concentration of zinc and lead before smelting. The main operators of this process were the so called flotadur, who were responsible for operating the flotation cells. The facility was opened in 1915 by the English Crown Spelter Company. Based in Bristol and Swansea, this British firm invested in the area to secure raw materials for its smelting operations in the United Kingdom. Ownership was later transferred to the Belgian company Vieille Montagne and subsequently to AMMI-SAPEZ. The plant remained active until the closure of the mines in 1982 and is currently abandoned.

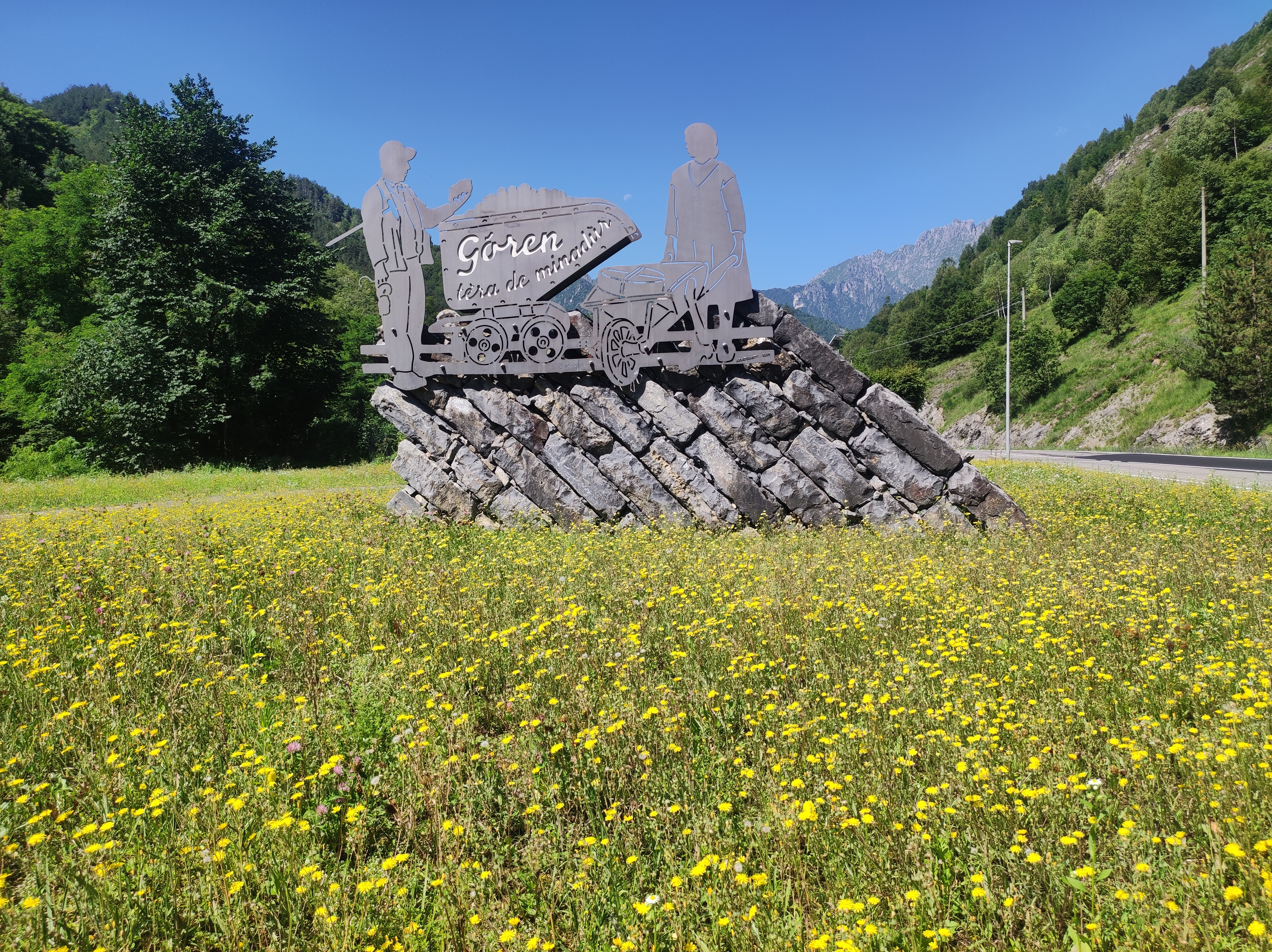
The monument dedicated to the Miner and the Taissina, located at the entrance to the Gorno mining area.

=== The monument to the Miner and the Taissina ===
The Monument to the Miner and the Taissina is located between the locality of Centrale and the Sanctuary of the Holy Crucifix, at the entrance to the municipality of Gorno. It is dedicated to the miners and the taissina of the local mining tradition. The monument is considered one of the symbols of the Gorno Mining Ecomuseum, recognized by the Lombardy Region.

=== Campello di Gorno ===
Campello di Gorno was a village built between the 1930s and 1940s to house miners and their families. It included residential buildings, administrative offices, a school, and a church - all constructed in the rationalist architectural style typical of that period.

== Gallery ==
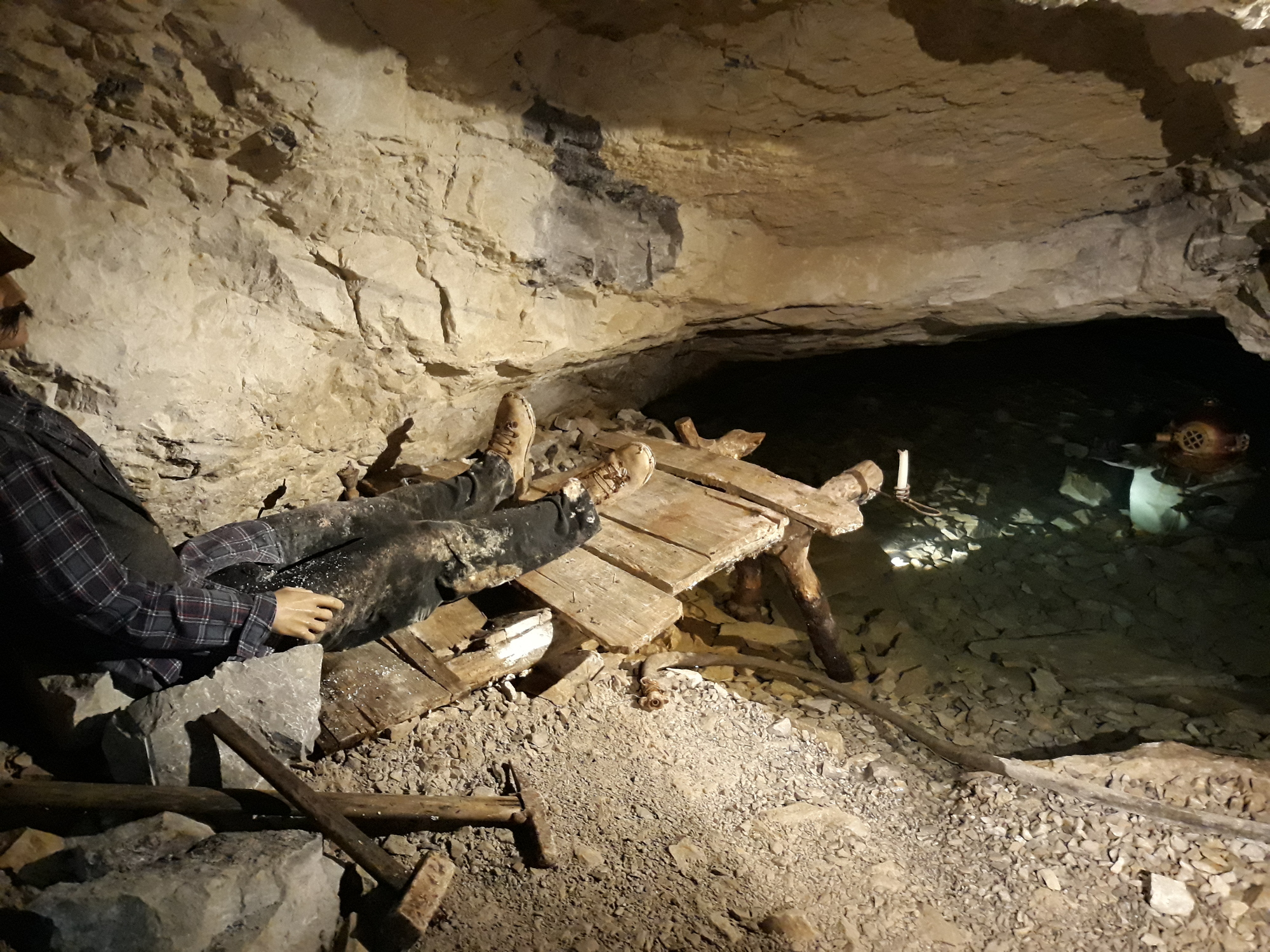
Modesto Varischetti Rescue, an Italian miner in Australia. He got stuck for nine days in the mines of Bonnivale after a flood in 1907. Reproduction of the event in the Ecomuseum of Gorno.

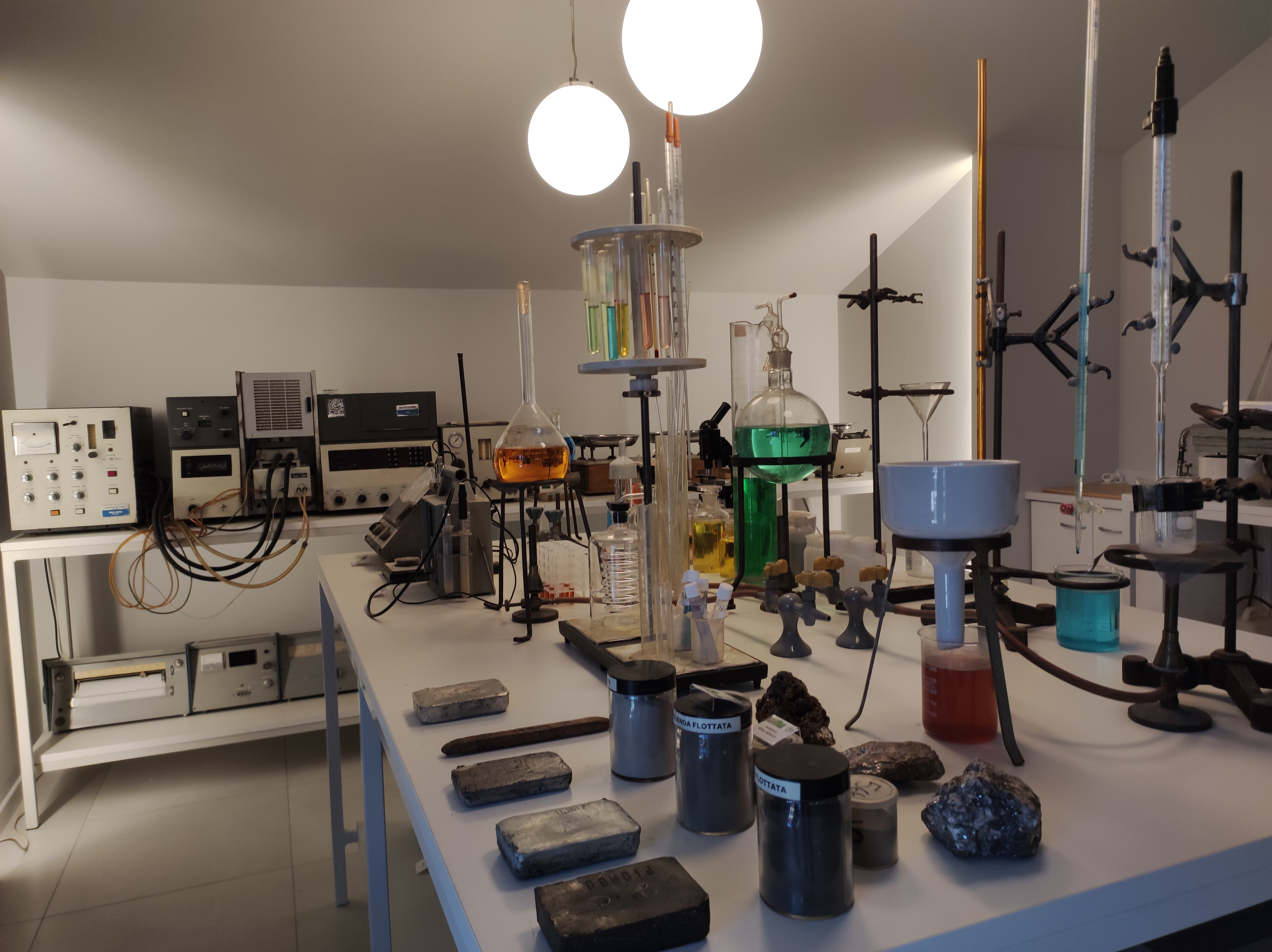
Interior of the chemical-laboratory exhibition with original equipment at the Mining Museum of Gorno, Bergamo Province, Lombardy, Italy.

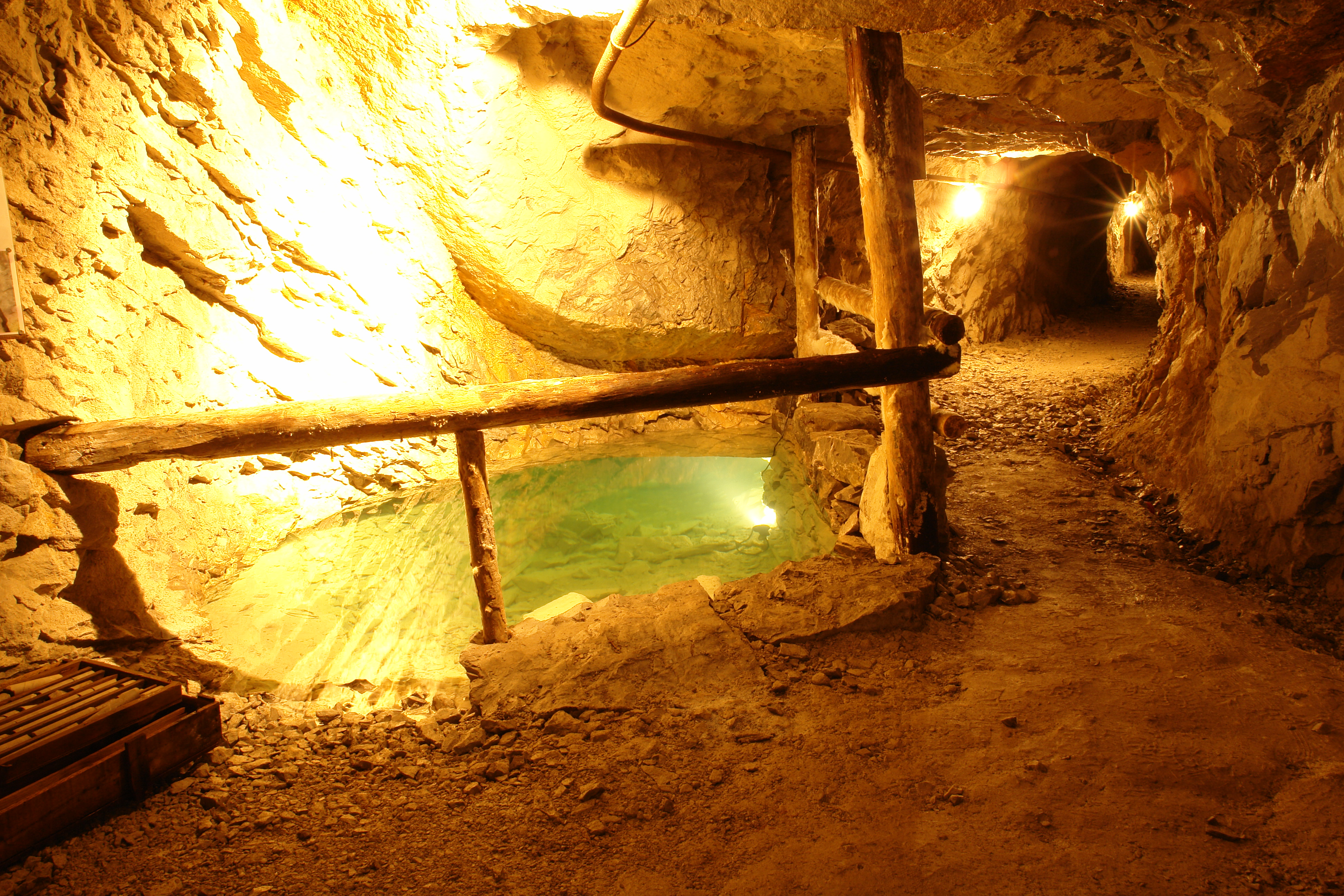
Interior of a former mine at the Mines of Gorno, featuring an underground lake, Bergamo Province, Lombardy, Italy.

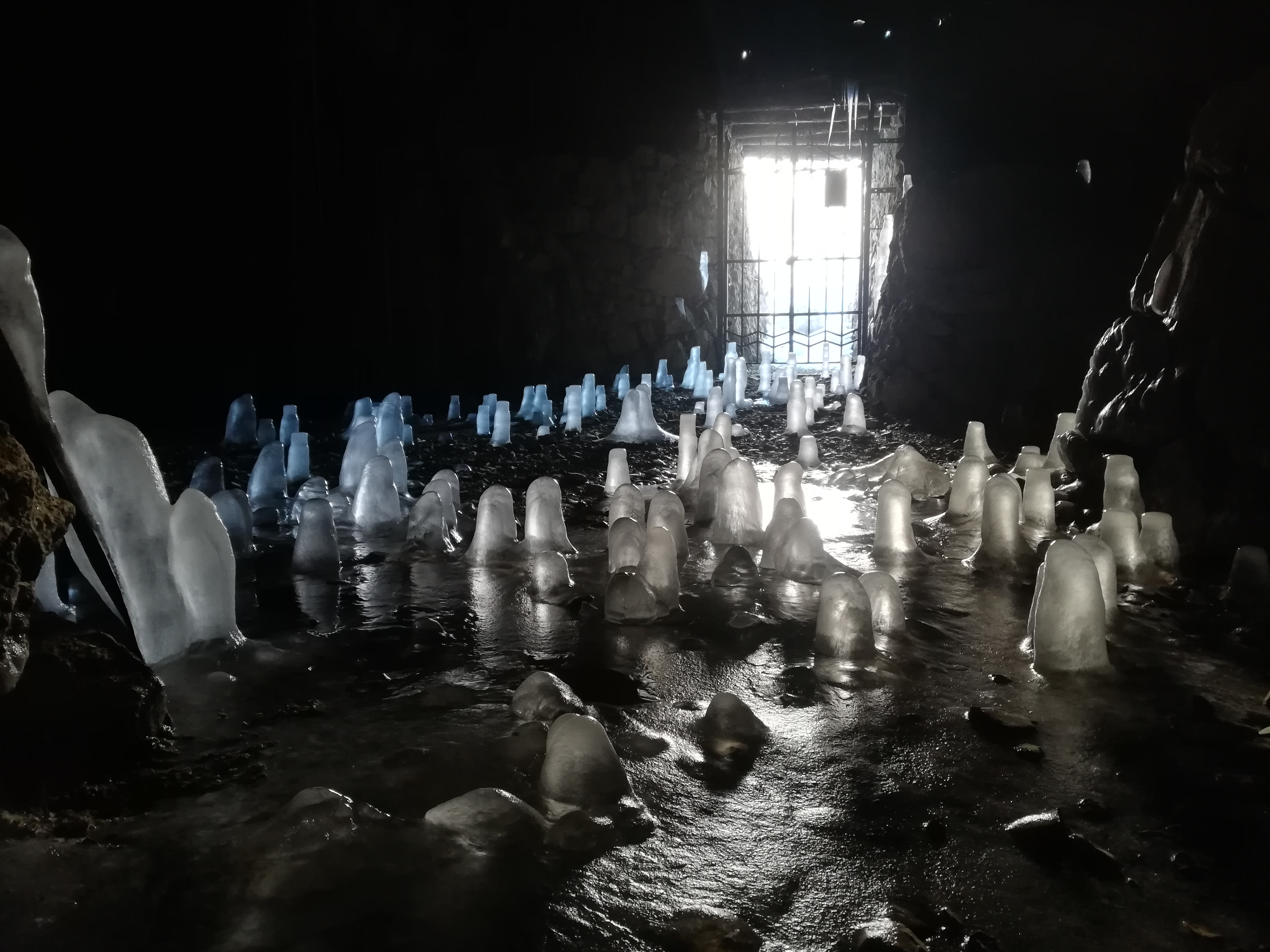
"Lacca Bassa", exit of the mines of Gorno in winter, Lombardy, Italy.

== See also ==
- Zinc mining
- Bergamasque Alps
- Val Seriana
- Modesto Varischetti
- Industrial archaeology
- Mineralogy
- Industrial heritage
- Alpine orogeny
