= Bonnievale =

Bonnievale may refer to:

- Bonnievale, Western Cape, a village in South Africa
- Bonnie Vale, Western Australia, an abandoned townsite in Australia
