= The Red Mirage =

1913 novel by Ida Alexa Ross Wylie

The Red Mirage is a 1913 novel by Ida Alexa Ross Wylie. It was her third novel, and was immensely popular, reportedly making her a "darling of the media." It was adapted multiple times into motion pictures, including versions in 1915 and 1928, respectively under the titles The Unknown and The Foreign Legion.

The action is set predominantly in the town of Sidi Bel Abbès, and most of the male characters are members of the French Foreign Legion. The plot primarily concerns the romantic troubles caused by the character Sylvia Omney when she chooses to marry Captain Desiré Arnaud instead of her long-time friend Richard Farquhar. A subplot concerns Farquhar's father's shady past and the impact it is continuing to have on the life of his son.

In 1928 a photoplay edition of the book was released to coincide with the release of The Foreign Legion.

== Sources ==
Passion's Fortune: The Story of Mills and Boon, by Joseph McAleer.

https://www.imdb.com/name/nm0943782/
