= George Darrell =

Australian playwright (1851–1921)

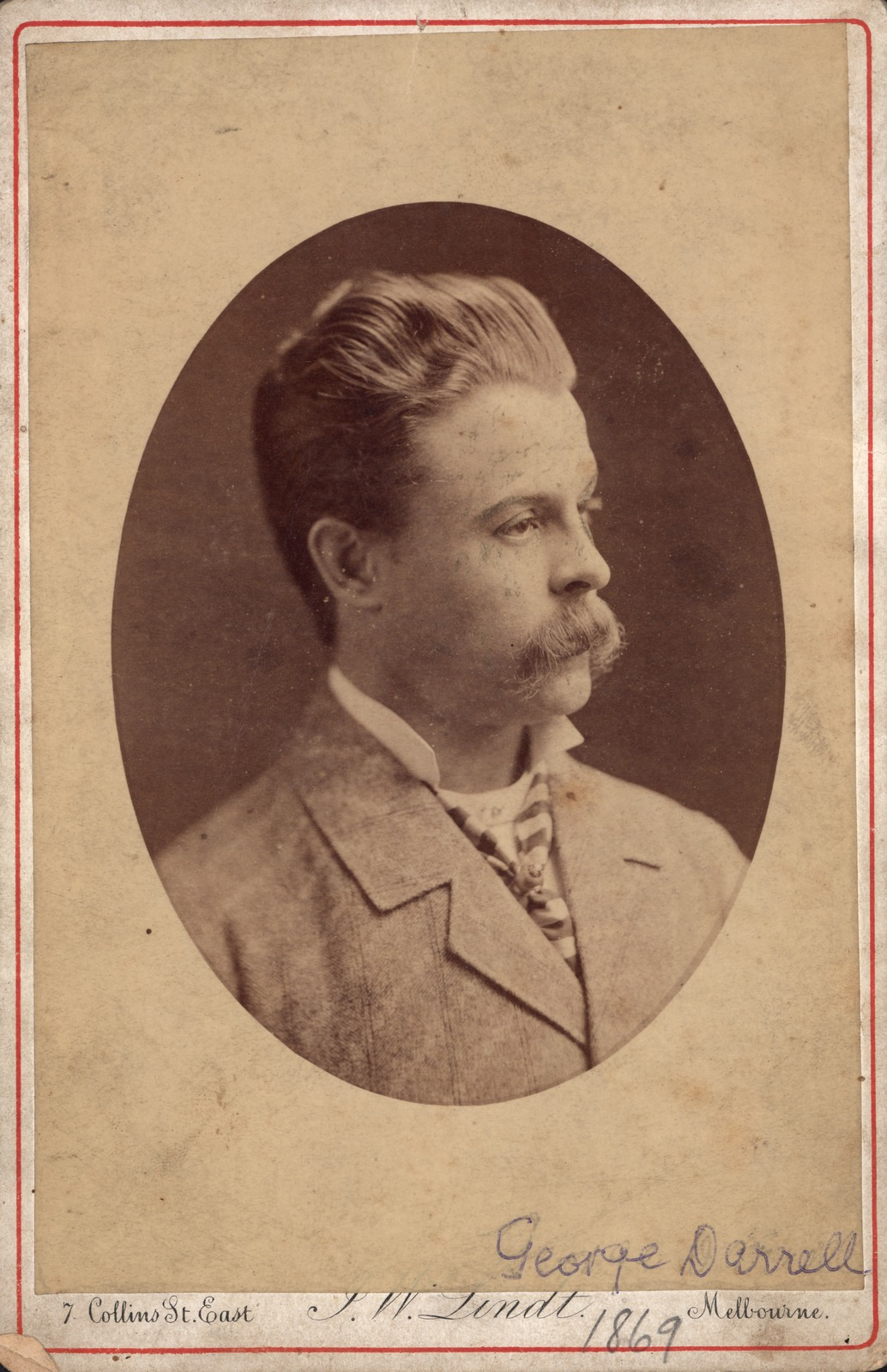
- Darrell photographed by J. W. Lindt, 1869
- Born: George Frederick Price Darrell; 1851; England
- Died: 28 January 1921 (aged 69–70); Dee Why, New South Wales, Australia
- Occupations: Playwright, actor, theatrical manager
- Spouses: Fanny Cathcart (m. 1870; died 1880): Christine "Cissie" Peachey (m. 1886)
- Children: Rupert Darrell
- Writing career
- Period: 1868–1916
- Notable work: The Sunny South (1883)

George Frederick Price Darrell (1851–1921) was an English-born Australian playwright, actor and theatrical manager. He was one of the most successful colonial dramatists of his generation and styled himself a "Native Australian Dramatist". He is best remembered for the melodrama The Sunny South (1883), which he performed more than 1,500 times and which was later made into a film The Sunny South or The Whirlwind of Fate.

== Early life and acting career ==
Born in Bath, England, Darrell began his professional career with Fanny Simonsen's in Simonsen's Opera Company in New Zealand; but, on migrating to Melbourne, took to the regular dramatic profession, earning some distinction as a juvenile supporter of the once idolised Walter Montgomery.

In 1870 he married Mrs. Robert Heir (née Fanny Cathcart), the admirable tragédienne, much his senior. Darrell became her stage manager and the couple subsequently toured New Zealand, America, England and Australia, forming a successful partnership. Cathcart died in 1880.

Darrell formed close personal relationships with his theatrical colleagues including George Coppin, Richard Stewart, and A.R. Harwood, and was influential in helping to bring J.C. Williamson and Maggie Moore to Australia.

== Playwright and manager ==
From the late 1870s Darrell concentrated on writing and producing his own work in the style of what was then called "colonial drama". These Anglo-Australian plays drew on the romance of the goldfields, horse-racing and pioneering life. Aiming at spectacular, sensational theatre, he enjoyed "a good run of success" and drew large audiences.

In 1878 he formed the "Australian Dramatic Company for the Production of Australian Plays", which name was subsequently used by Alfred Dampier, but the connection between the two, if any, has not been found. His company staged Transported for Life (1876) and Back from the Grave (1878) in popular and spectacular productions in Melbourne and Sydney.

In 1883 Darrell produced his best-known piece, The Sunny South (1883) at the Prince of Wales Opera House, with Essie Jenyns in the starring role. He was to perform in the play himself as the hero, Matthew "Mat" Morley, more than 1500 times. In London in 1884 he opened with it at the Grand Theatre, Islington earning acclaim never before given to a colonial dramatist, although the season was interrupted when he was injured by a bowie knife. The play was again produced in 1898, setting a further record for an Australian playwright.

== Later career and decline ==
Darrell continued to turn out numerous pieces on Australian themes and spent much of his time in England, touring to New Zealand and Australia with the Darrell Dramatic Company. A lengthy illness in 1887 prevented him from acting and writing. Some Australian critics remained lukewarm, but he was popular with audiences, which allowed him to continue producing. A complimentary benefit at Melbourne's Theatre Royal, organised by his colleagues, and the entrepreneur George Coppin presented him with an illuminated address for his services to "native drama". However, not all his plays were well received by audiences at the turn of the century.

His last play, The Land of Gold was staged by William Anderson's Company at the Criterion Theatre, Sydney in 1907. A four-act melodrama, The Land of Gold staged a recreation of the real-life rescue of Modesto Varishchetti's at Bonnie Vale (the entombed miner saved by diver Frank Hughes earier in 1907), grafted onto a conventional plot of gambling ruin and a bigamist villain. It ran about a fortnight, closing in early December 1907, and reviews praised the rescue scenes while calling the rest "melodrama on old lines". Bland Holt had beaten Darrell to the same subject by a month with The Great Rescue.

By 1916 he was writing short stories and published a novel, The Belle of the Bush' (Sydney).

== Personal life and death ==
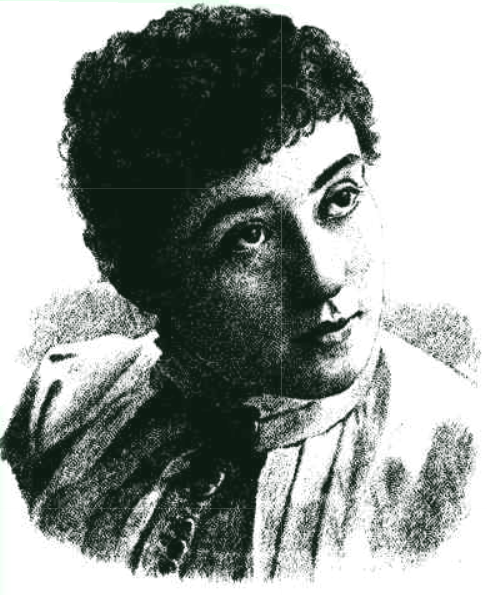
Head and shoulders portrait of Christine Darrell, published in "The Lorgnette", a 19th-century Australian theatre magazine

On 6 May 1886, in New Zealand, Darrell married his second wife, Christine ("Cissie") Peachey, a young actress in one of his companies. With Christine Darrell gave birth to their son, Rupert Darrell, who became a pantomime actor in Australia and the United States.

After the death of his second wife and the departure of Rupert, ill health and financial difficulties, Darrell was said to have become increasingly despondent. On 21 January 1921 he left his lodgings in Darlinghurst, Sydney, leaving a note to his landlady and friend, stating he was "going on a long voyage". Darrell's body was washed ashore at Dee Why on 29 January 1921. He had died by drowning, found to be suicide as evidenced by the note he left for his landlady, Mrs Barnet.

== Select writings ==
- Man and Wife (1871)
- Matrimonial Manoeuvres (1872)
- Dark Deeds (1873)
- Friends of the Flag; Or, The Struggle for Freedom (1874)
- Her Face, Her Fortune (1874)
- The Trump Card (1874)
- The Four Fetes (1875)
- Transported for Life (1876)
- Back from the Grave (1878)
- The Forlorn Hope; or, A Tale of Tomorrow (1879)
- Solange (1882)
- The Naked Truth (1883)
- The Sunny South (1883)
- The Squatter (1885)
- The Soggarth (1886)
- The New Rush (1886)
- Hue and Cry (1888)
- The Mystery of a Hansom Cab a.k.a. Midnight Melbourne (1888) – stage version of the Fergus Hume novel The Mystery of a Hansom Cab
- The Queen of Bohemia (1888)
- The Pakeha (1890)
- Mr Potter of Texas (1890)
- The Lucky Lot (1890)
- The Double Event (1893)
- The Crimson Thread (1894)
- Convict Once (1896)
- The Land of Dawning (1896)
- The Queen of Coolgardie (1897)
- The Sorrows of Satan (1897)
- The Light That Failed (1899)
- The Adventures of Louis de Rougemont (1899)
- The Punter (1902)
- Sappho (1902)
- Justice or Murder (1902)
- Paris and Pleasure (1904)
- The Battle and the Breeze (1905)
- The Land of Gold (1907)
- The Belle of the Bush (1916) – novel

== Notes ==
As a playwright his name has been confused with that of Charles Darrell, author of When London Sleeps, The Power and the Glory and Defender of the Faith.
