= Remorse, a Story of the Red Plague =

- Directed by: J. E. Mathews
- Starring: Cyril Mackay
- Cinematography: Harry Krischok
- Production company: Mathews Photoplay Producing Company
- Distributed by: Co-Operative Film Exchange (NSW)
- Release date: 3 January 1917 (Adelaide)
- Running time: 4 reels
- Country: Australia
- Languages: Silent film English intertitles

Remorse, a Story of the Red Plague is a 1917 Australian silent film about a naive country boy who visits the big city and contracts syphilis. The movie is now considered a lost film.

== Plot ==
Jack Rundle (Cyril Mackay) works on a station and falls in love with his father's ward, Nellie Fallon (Mabel Dyson). When he goes to the city on business he falls into bad company, contracts syphilis and returns home to find himself an outcast. Years later he finds his brother Ted has married Nellie. He then kills himself.

== Production ==
The film was shot in Adelaide, using pupils from Mathews' acting school.

== Release ==
There was some doubt over whether the movie would be released. But the South Australian censor passed it because they regarded it as having a moral message, although children under sixteen were not admitted. Public response was very strong.

The film was originally banned in New South Wales by the censor but this was overturned on appeal.

== Cast ==
- Cyril Mackay as Jack Rundle
- Mabel Dyson as Nellie Fallon
- Ida Gresham
- Marie D’Alton
- C.R. Stanford
- Victor Fitzherbert
- Claude Burton
