= The Sunny South (play) =

Australian play by George Darrell

The Sunny South is an Australian drama in five acts and eight tableaux by George Darrell. Claimed as the first all-Australian play, its first production in 1883 was a resounding success and was taken to London the following year. It was made into a silent film The Sunny South or The Whirlwind of Fate in 1915, now considered lost. The play was published in 1975.

== Plot outline ==
Matt Morley is swindled out of his inheritance and leaves for Australia. He finds a gold nugget which he takes to the bank for safe storage. The bank is held up by a gang of bushrangers led by Dick Duggan, but is cleverly foiled. Duggan is brought to justice but escapes. Morley's adopted daughter Babs Berkley is abducted then bravely rescued. They marry and the English estate is returned to him.

For fuller details, see Plot of film

== First production ==
Its first public performance was at the Melbourne Opera House on Saturday, 31 March 1883. It was claimed to be the first Australian production where each actor was specially selected to suit the part. The company was engaged by the directors, Darrell and Holloway, and included

- George Darrell as Matthew "Mat" Morley, the hero
- Essie Jenyns, Bertha "Babs" Berkley, his adopted daughter; they are in love
- Constance Deorwyn as Rebecca Hann, waiting maid, a comic part
- Lance Lenton, amiable bank teller Johnny Jinks, another comic part
- Charles Holloway as Dick Duggan, bushranger
- H. A. Douglass, Black Steve, his offsider
- W. J. Holloway, Ben Brewer, Morley's rough and ready digger mate
- J. A. Patterson as Monti Jack, a "bird of prey"
- Olly Deering as Eli Grup, financier
- Henry R. Jewett as True, bank teller
- Henry Leston, Plantagenet Smiffer, a pompous footman
- J. J. Kennedy as squire Worthy Chester (Note: Played on opening night by Edwin Palmer, the only actor showing no enthusiasm for his part.)
- Alice Deorwyn, Clarice Chester, his daughter, an English country gentlewoman
- F. C. Appleton, Ivo Carew an English gentleman, in love with Clarice Chester
- Harry Daniels, Perfidy Pounce, lawyer working for Grup
- Neil O'Brien as Jim, a blacktracker
- J. Wisdom, Narrow Creek Joe, a "tintinnabulist" (bellringer?)
- Alfred Rolfe as police sergeant Swoop

Most of these were also in the London cast of Sunny South. Other players mentioned are Kate Arden, Maria Hill, K. Herbert, and Carrie Bilton.

Scenery (as much a drawcard in those days as the leading actors) by A. C. Habbe.

== London ==
Darrell took his play to London, and according to reports was doing good business when he was injured by an actor, not named, who bungled the scene where the hero was freed from his bonds with a bowie knife. The resulting wound required no less than four operations, and compelled his return to Adelaide by the Orient Line steamer Garonne on 4 April 1885.

== As literature ==
"At the Theatre Royal George Darrell's " Sunny South" is cramming the popular seats. Darrell has managed in technical phrase to "knock the gallery." In other words, he writes down to the level of gallery intelligence . . . and the person who is content to stoop so low fills his pockets. Nothing is more easy. Claptrap and pistol shots are always sufficient to capture the mob . . . any person with some knowledge of the stage, able to write penny-a-liner paragraphs, and not gifted with an artistic conscience or artistic ideas, can do it. Then, too, there being no creation of character, anything beyond an ordinary memory and the ability to fire a revolver is perfectly unnecessary . . . Indeed, the last act depends entirely on revolvers for its very existence, while the villain scowls round with a revolver always handy . . . Curiously enough, not a single apparition in the entire hotch-poth is distinctively Australian . . . Darrell's so-called "gentlemen" are cads of the wretchedest description . . . Any variations from Houndsditch are copper-plated Yankeeisms such as may be acquired by a short sojourn among the lower classes of New York. The whole pitiable business means theatrical retrogression of the worst possible kind. As Wilson Barratt lately put it — "The success of a worthless play benefits none — except the manager and author." Nothing in the shape of a play was ever more worthless than The Sunny South."

== Revival ==
The play was revived in 1980 by the Sydney Theatre Company in a production directed by Richard Wherrett with music by Terence Clarke. It was the first production at the STC.
