= Allen Doone =

American actor (1878–1948)

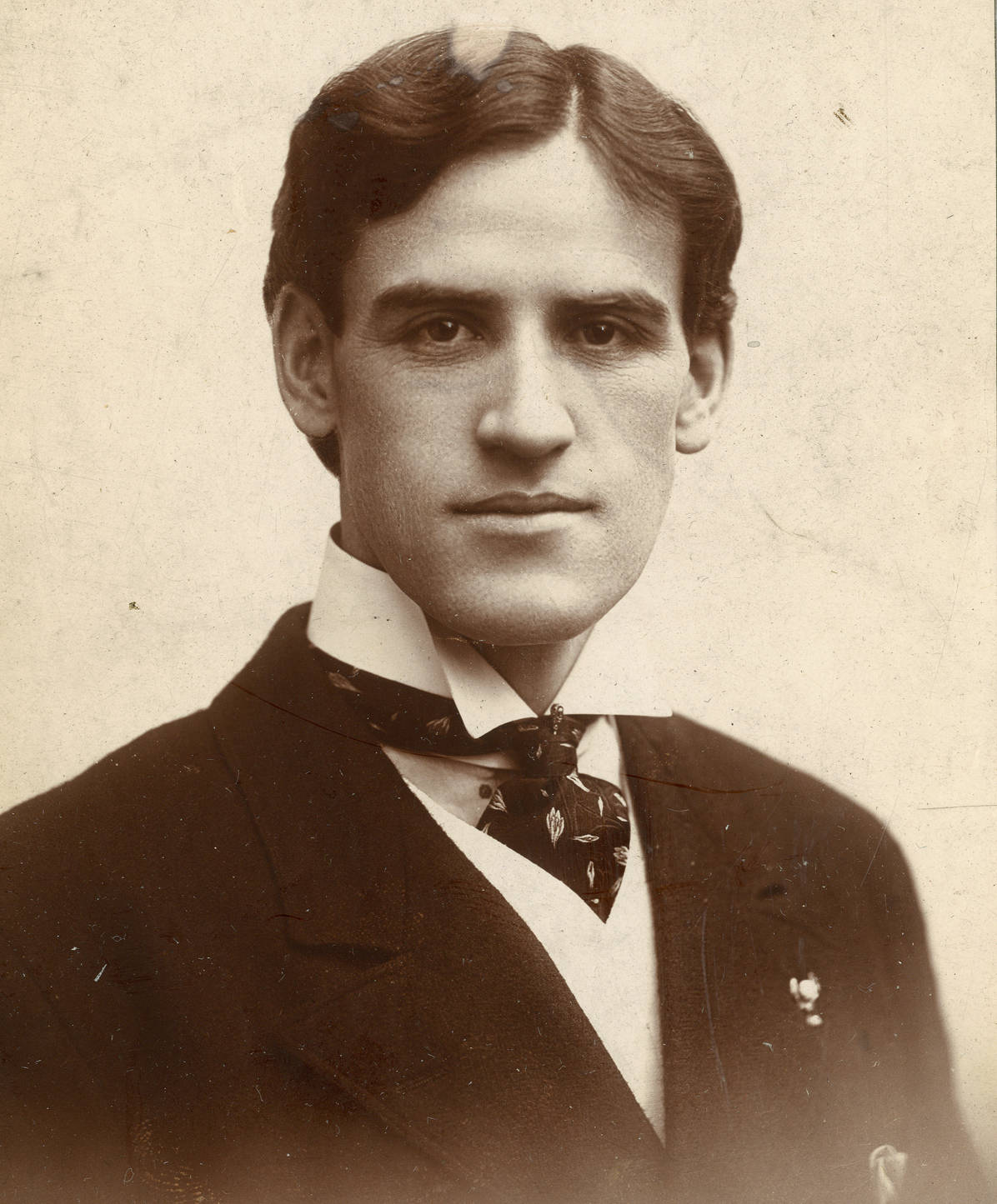
- Born: September 3, 1878; Amboy, Illinois, U.S.
- Died: May 4, 1948 (aged 69)
- Occupations: Tenor, comic actor
- Spouse: Edna Keeley

Allen Doone (Edward Allen) (3 September 1878 – 4 May 1948) was an American tenor and comic actor who specialised in Irish romantic dramas. Doone was born in Amboy, Illinois, to Irish immigrants Kate and James Allen.

From 1909 to 1938, Allen had his own theatre company in Australia. He moved back to the USA where he died. At the time of his death, he was married to actress Edna Keeley.

He starred in the feature film The Rebel (1915).

== Select theatre credits ==
- The Rebel (1913)
- The Wearing of the Green (1914)
- Lucky O'Shea (1924)
- Sweet County Kerry
- Parish Priest
- In Old Donegal
- Molly Bawa
