= Keeper of the Flame (film) =

1943 film by George Cukor

- Release poster
- Directed by: George Cukor
- Screenplay by: Donald Ogden Stewart
- Based on: Keeper of the Flame by I. A. R. Wylie
- Produced by: Victor Saville
- Starring: Katharine Hepburn; Spencer Tracy; Richard Whorf; Margaret Wycherly; Forrest Tucker; Frank Craven; Horace McNally; Percy Kilbride
- Cinematography: William H. Daniels
- Edited by: James E. Newcom
- Music by: Bronisław Kaper
- Production company: Metro-Goldwyn-Mayer
- Distributed by: Loew's Inc.
- Release date: December 1942
- Running time: 100 minutes
- Country: United States
- Language: English
- Budget: $1.17 million
- Box office: $3.2 million

Keeper of the Flame is a 1942 American drama film directed by George Cukor, starring Katharine Hepburn and Spencer Tracy, and released by Metro-Goldwyn-Mayer (MGM). The screenplay by Donald Ogden Stewart is adapted from the 1942 novel Keeper of the Flame by I. A. R. Wylie. Hepburn plays the widow of a famous civic leader who has died in an automobile accident. Tracy portrays a former war correspondent who intends to write a flattering biography of the dead man, only to find that his death is shrouded in mystery. Screenwriter Stewart considered the script for the film to be the finest moment of his career, feeling vindicated by the assignment as he believed that Hollywood had punished him for years for his political views. Principal filming began in the last week of August 1942, four months after the release of the novel, published by Random House. It was filmed on a sound stage, with no location shooting.

The film was screened for the Office of War Information's Bureau of Motion Pictures on December 2, 1942, where it was disapproved of by the bureau chief, Lowell Mellett.

Keeper of the Flame premiered at the Albee Theatre in Cincinnati on January 28, 1943. The film set a box-office record for the city. A few other limited dates followed in February. It premiered at Radio City Music Hall on Thursday, March 18, 1943. Its Australian premiere was at the Metro Theatre in Melbourne in June 1943. The film appeared on American television in March 1957.

== Plot ==
On a rainy night, national hero Robert V. Forrest drives his automobile over a small bridge that has collapsed. He is killed, and the entire United States goes into deep mourning. Admirer and renowned journalist Stephen O'Malley returns from Europe to write a biography of the great man. Among the throngs covering the funeral, he finds his old friends and fellow reporters, Jane Harding and Freddie Ridges. They remain after the rest of the press leave the funeral.

Forrest's widow, Christine, refuses to speak to reporters throughout the proceedings. However, O'Malley befriends youngster Jeb, son of the gatekeeper of the Forrest estate, Jason Rickards. The grief-stricken boy shows him a way into the mansion, where O'Malley meets Christine. Although she is cordial, she refuses to provide information for his biography of her husband. After O'Malley leaves, Forrest's private secretary, Clive Kerndon, fearful of how the reporter will react to the brush-off, convinces Christine to offer her help to O'Malley so that they can guide the biographer in the direction they want.

Over time, O'Malley gains the widow's trust. Christine is the "keeper of the flame", protecting her husband's memory and reputation. O'Malley's instincts tell him that a secret is being kept from him. He discovers that Forrest's elderly, mentally ill mother is living in a separate house on the vast estate. Despite her servants' attempts to keep them apart, O'Malley manages to speak with her and obtains more clues from her ramblings.

O'Malley notices "the arsenal", an old fortification near the Forrest mansion that served as Robert Forrest's office and library. One afternoon, O'Malley observes smoke rising from the arsenal chimney. When he asks Kerndon about the building's purpose, Kerndon (who cannot see the smoke) tells him it is only a storehouse. O'Malley slips away to investigate. He discovers Christine burning what she claims are love letters, but he suspects otherwise. Later, Kerndon telephones somebody and assures the unnamed party that he will take care of the situation. As O'Malley learns more, he finds evidence implicating Christine in her husband's death and begins to wonder whether she and her cousin, Geoffrey Midford, are lovers and murderers. However, his theory is discounted by Christine's reaction when Geoffrey announces his engagement to the daughter of gatekeeper Rickards.

When O'Malley reveals that he cares for Christine, she finally breaks down and discloses the ugly truth. Her husband had been corrupted by the adulation he received and plotted to use his enormous influence to turn Americans to fascist ideals to gain control of the United States. She shows O'Malley papers stored in the arsenal that reveal how Forrest (backed by secretive, ultra-wealthy, power-hungry individuals) planned to use racism, anti-union sentiment, and antisemitism to divide the country, turning social groups against one another in order to create the chaos that would let him seize power. Christine had discovered the plot the day before her husband's death. She went riding the next morning and, coming upon the washed-out bridge, decided that instead of warning her husband about it, a resulting accidental "clean death in the rain was the best thing that could happen to Robert Forrest". O'Malley convinces her to help him write a book detailing Forrest's scheme.

Kerndon eavesdrops and hears the conversation. He then locks the arsenal door, sets the building ablaze, and shoots into the building through an embrasure. Christine, fatally injured, urges O'Malley to write his book. A man rushes to the burning building carrying an axe, but Kerndon comes up behind him and knocks him out by hitting the man in the head with a gun. Then an automobile driven by Midford rushes to the scene and Kerndon stands in the middle of the road and shoots at the passengers; he is run down and killed. Midford leaves the car, picks up the axe, rushes to the building, breaks through the door, and O'Malley is rescued.

O'Malley ultimately writes a book entitled Christine Forrest: Her Life that exposes the plot.

== Cast ==
- Spencer Tracy as Stephen O'Malley
- Katharine Hepburn as Christine Forrest
- Richard Whorf as Clive Kerndon
- Margaret Wycherly as Mrs. Forrest
- Forrest Tucker as Geoffrey Midford
- Frank Craven as Doctor Fielding, one of the few critical of Forrest
- Stephen McNally (billed as "Horace McNally") as Freddie Ridges
- Percy Kilbride as Orion Peabody, O'Malley's taxi driver
- Audrey Christie as Jane Harding
- Darryl Hickman as Jeb Rickards
- Donald Meek as Mr. Arbuthnot
- Howard Da Silva as Jason Rickards
- William Newell as Piggot

== Production ==
=== Script and casting ===
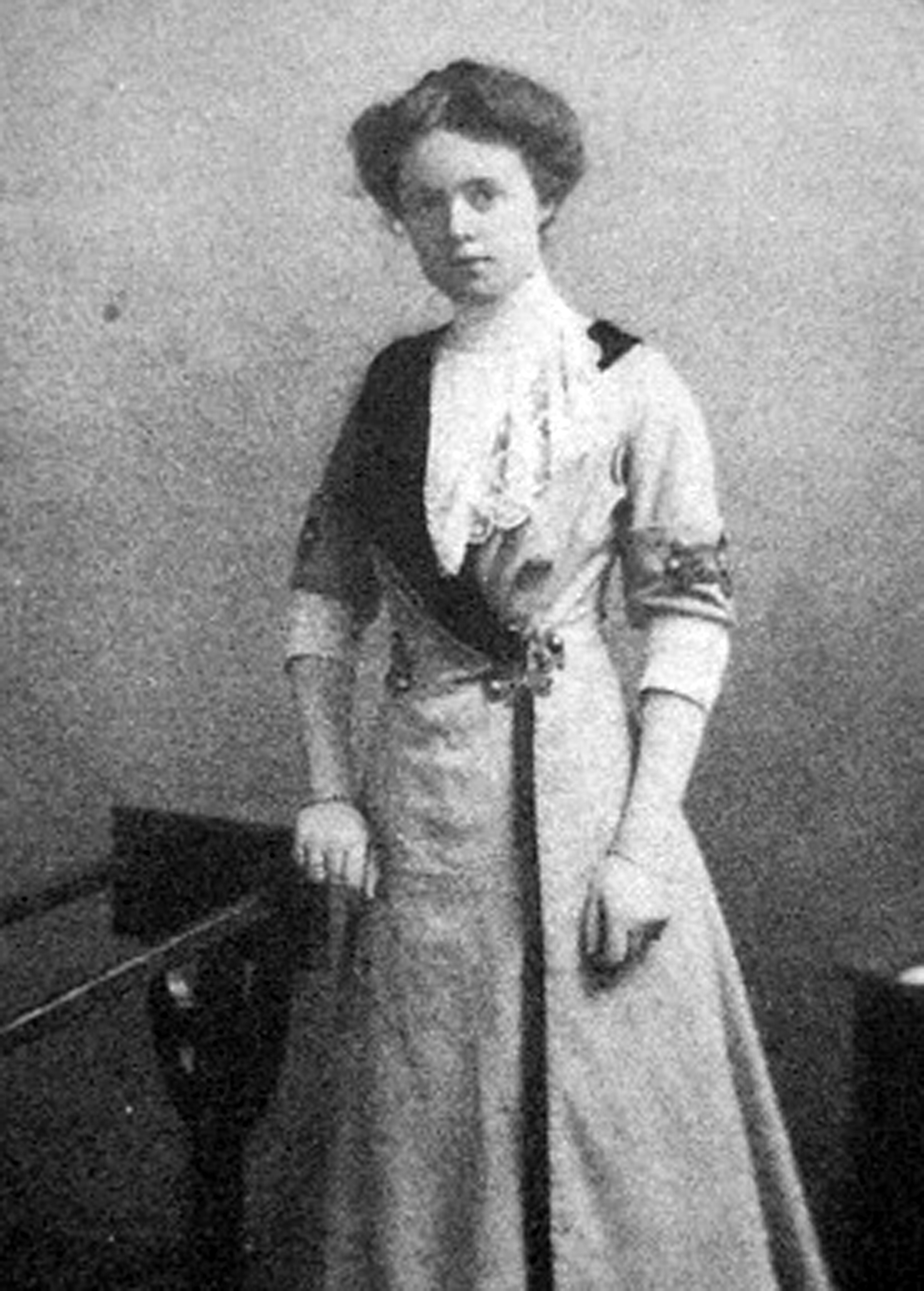
The film was based on an unpublished novel by I. A. R. Wylie that would be published shortly before the film debuted

The script was based on an unpublished novel by I. A. R. Wylie. RKO Pictures bought the novel in outline form in April 1941, but encountered casting difficulties and sold the rights to MGM in December 1941 for $50,000. A day or two after they had obtained the rights, MGM Vice-president Eddie Mannix realized the source material was political in nature and tried to abandon the project. However, following the attack on Pearl Harbor, Mannix relented and the production went forward. Once the film went into production at MGM, in April 1942 the novel was published by Random House.

MGM studio head Louis B. Mayer assigned the script to Donald Ogden Stewart—one of his favorite screenwriters. Because up to that time, Stewart had written only light romantic comedies featuring wealthy East Coast socialites, Mayer's choice seemed unusual, but Mayer felt Stewart's strongly leftist political leanings would enable him to write a better screenplay than his other screenwriters.

Stewart approached the project with gusto, remarking that he "wrote an adaptation from a novel that tells about the fascist mice who are nibbling away at our country while we're busy fighting a good war". Stewart believed Hollywood had punished him for years for his political views and felt vindicated by the assignment, declaring that "here was my compensation for the sabotage of my radical attempt to do my bit ...". The script was the proudest moment of his entire career. Stewart, however, had extensive problems adapting the novel for the screen, and filming—originally due to begin in June 1942—was delayed for several months while he worked on the screenplay. He consulted with the Bureau of Motion Pictures in the U.S. Office of War Information, an agency of the federal government created in June 1942 to promote patriotism and to warn the public about domestic spying. (Note: "Early in the summer of 1942, the [OWI] had been asked to "supply the thinking" for the picture, one of the few pictures to deal with the threat of domestic fascism. ... Keeper of the Flame did indeed reflect the war aims of OWI ..." "O'Malley confronts Christine Forrest with evidence that she let her husband be killed when she could have saved him, and she finally admits her guilt and justifies her action by speaking of the real nature of Robert Forrest and the Forward American Association. In the long speech that she makes, the thinking of the OWI and the convictions of the screenwriter merge to produce the only real political analysis of the film." "Another film that regurgitated OWI propaganda was M-G-M's Keeper of the Flame, the least watchable movie that Katharine Hepburn and Spencer Tracy made together." "Regardless, Donald Ogden Stewart (with input from the Office of War Information) wrote Keeper of The Flame (1942), starring Spencer Tracy ..." "Recent research has disclosed how liberal and internationalist-minded censors of the bureau, headed by Lowell Mellett, a former Scripps-Howard editor, worked with the studios, script by script, to coax Hollywood in the direction of a more high-minded view of the conflict. George Cukor's Keeper of the Flame (1942), released at the low point of the first wave of racist war pictures, represents the first appearance of a Hollywood message film that sought to establish a commanding—and, more important, a respectable—leadership position vis-à-vis the American people.")

Just days after MGM purchased the rights to the novel, Spencer Tracy had been cast as the male lead in the film. George Cukor was chosen to direct in late April 1942 because he had dealt well with troubled and headstrong actors in the past, and Tracy was considered a difficult actor to direct. Bronisław Kaper, who had come to MGM in 1935 from Nazi Germany, was assigned to compose the film score. William H. Daniels was named the cinematographer.

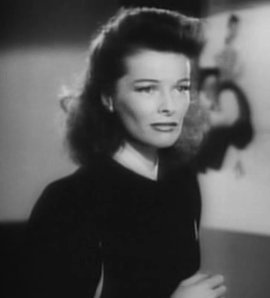
Katharine Hepburn in 1943, the year Keeper of the Flame premiered

Katharine Hepburn joined the cast in mid-April 1942 after Stewart sent her a copy of the unfinished script. Hepburn was fascinated by the character of Christine, and felt that doing the film would be a way of contributing to the war effort. MGM executives did not want Hepburn attached to the film, feeling it was an inappropriate follow-up for her (first) previous pairing with Tracy in Woman of the Year (1942), but Hepburn insisted, and MGM relented. Hepburn showed some concerns with Stewart's redrafting of the script, in that he toned down the novel's love story, placing more emphasis on the character of O'Malley and the action. She asked for more romance in the film. Although Hepburn had spent much of the prior year searching for scripts with equally strong gender parts for the lead characters that she determined would be suitable for Hepburn and Tracy to portray, she now requested that the O'Malley role be restored to the function it served in the novel (where O'Malley is impotent, troubled, and despairing of love) and for the part for Christine to be expanded. Film producer Victor Saville threatened to resign if the changes were made, and Spencer Tracy supported him, which led to the proposed changes being rejected. Hepburn continued to be upset by the script, and dealt with this problem by isolating herself from friends and family in order to concentrate on her interpretation of the role.

The script did have numerous problems and Stewart refused to recognize these shortcomings. In late summer 1942, Cukor brought in Zoë Akins, one of his favorite playwrights and screenwriters, to help with the script. Victor Saville expressed concern that Stewart was basing more and more of the script on William Randolph Hearst, one of Louis B. Mayer's best friends, and that this might jeopardize the success of the film. As script work continued, casting on the film (which had been delayed months) went ahead in mid-1942. Richard Whorf was cast as the villain, Clive Kerndon, in early June. Frank Craven, Audrey Christie, Donald Meek, and Stephen McNally were all cast in mid-July. Pauline Lord was cast in late July, and Darryl Hickman added in early August. Craven, whose character was not initially specified, was given the role of Dr. Fielding in early August. Forrest Tucker and Percy Kilbride were the last members of the cast hired. Phyllis Brooks tested for a part in the film in mid-June, but was not cast. A search was even made for the voice of Robert Forrest.

=== Principal filming and post-production ===
Principal filming began the last week of August 1942. The filming was entirely on a sound stage, with no location shooting. Hepburn had already begun her extramarital affair with Spencer Tracy, and the production was notorious for the ways in which Hepburn doted on Tracy. Tracy drank heavily during the shoot, and Hepburn was his constant guardian, nurse, maid, and gofer during this time. She tried to keep him out of the bars, assisted him when he was drunk, reinforced his ego, and ran lines with him.

The filming process was an efficient one, and it was going so well that in the middle of the production Cukor asked Hepburn to talk to Judy Garland in an attempt to convince Garland of the need to sober up. In order to add realism to the production, Cukor consulted reporters from United Press for advice on how newspapermen would handle Forrest's funeral. Based on their critiques, Cukor changed the scene in the village hotel's bar so that instead of drinking and talking about the funeral, the reporters get to work drafting articles on their typewriters. The script, too, was changed to permit the bartender to make a quip about reporters working rather than drinking.

Reshoots occurred in September and October. Katharine Hepburn returned to Hollywood in early September for retakes, and Pauline Lord was called back in early October. Although James E. Newcom was the film editor, Cukor had the final cut on the film. Lord's scenes were deleted from the film, and her name did not appear on cast lists. She was replaced by Margaret Wycherly.

The film was screened for the Office of War Information's Bureau of Motion Pictures on December 2, 1942. The bureau chief, Lowell Mellett, was unhappy with the film and found it heavy-handed.

== Release ==
Keeper of the Flame premiered at the Albee Theatre in Cincinnati on January 28, 1943. The film set a box-office record for the city.

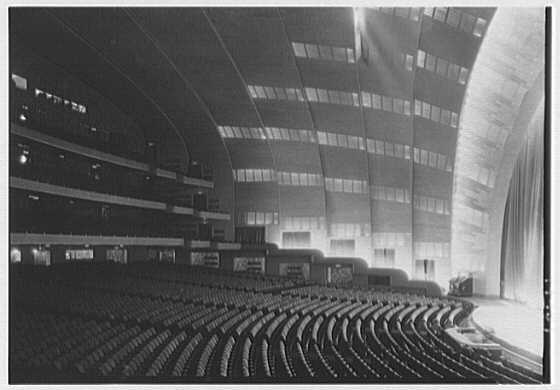
Radio City Music Hall, Manhattan

Following a few other limited dates in February, the film had a premiere in New York City at Radio City Music Hall on Thursday, March 18, 1943. The premiere served as a fundraiser for the Outdoor Cleanliness Association (a group dedicated to public lighting and enforcement of trash laws). The premiere did not go well: MGM head Louis B. Mayer stormed out, enraged by his having encouraged the making of a film that equated wealth with fascism. It opened in Los Angeles at Grauman's Chinese Theatre on Thursday, April 1, 1943. Keeper of the Flame made its Australian premiere at the Metro Theatre in Melbourne in June 1943. It did not appear on American television until March 1957.

Although MGM promoted Spencer Tracy for an Academy Award for Best Actor for his role in the film, he was not nominated by the academy.

=== Box office ===
The film was held over for a fourth week at Radio City Music Hall (most films lasted a week), but it did not do well at the box office nationally and is considered the least successful of the Hepburn-Tracy films. In the United States and Canada, it earned $2,190,000 {equivalent to US$43,153,259 in 2025) and $1,032,000 elsewhere, making an overall profit of $1,040,000 (equivalent to US$20,492,872 in 2025).

== Reception ==
The film generated some political controversy. Republican members of Congress complained about the film's obviously leftist politics and demanded that Will H. Hays, president of the Motion Picture Production Code, establish guidelines regarding propagandization for the motion picture industry.

Critical reaction at the time was mixed. While at least one reviewer felt the film was reminiscent of motion pictures such as Citizen Kane and Rebecca, Hedda Hopper called it "Citizen Kane with all the art scraped off". Bosley Crowther, writing in The New York Times, concluded that while the first half of the film was very good, the latter half felt slow and failed to deliver emotional punch. Crowther called the film "a courageous and timely drama" and praised Tracy and Hepburn for performances that featured "taut solemnity". But the script seemed uneven dramatically ("... the nature of this story is a murder mystery and yet the interest is centered much more upon the dead man than on the hunt"), and a critical problem was that the audience "is informed much sooner than the journalist what the nature of Forrest was, and the story drags while we wait for the journalist to catch up". Crowther still enjoyed Cukor's direction, which he felt sustained mystery even when little existed.

Concurring with Crowther, the Chicago Tribune and other critics pointed out that the film seemed slow. The Hartford Courant, meanwhile, raved about the film: "Hepburn and Tracy have given us a great film in Keeper of the Flame ... Great because of the courage and daring it took to make it, the magnificent production it has been given, the excellent acting within it, and the exciting, tense story it contains." Generally speaking, the film was better received in the eastern half of the United States.

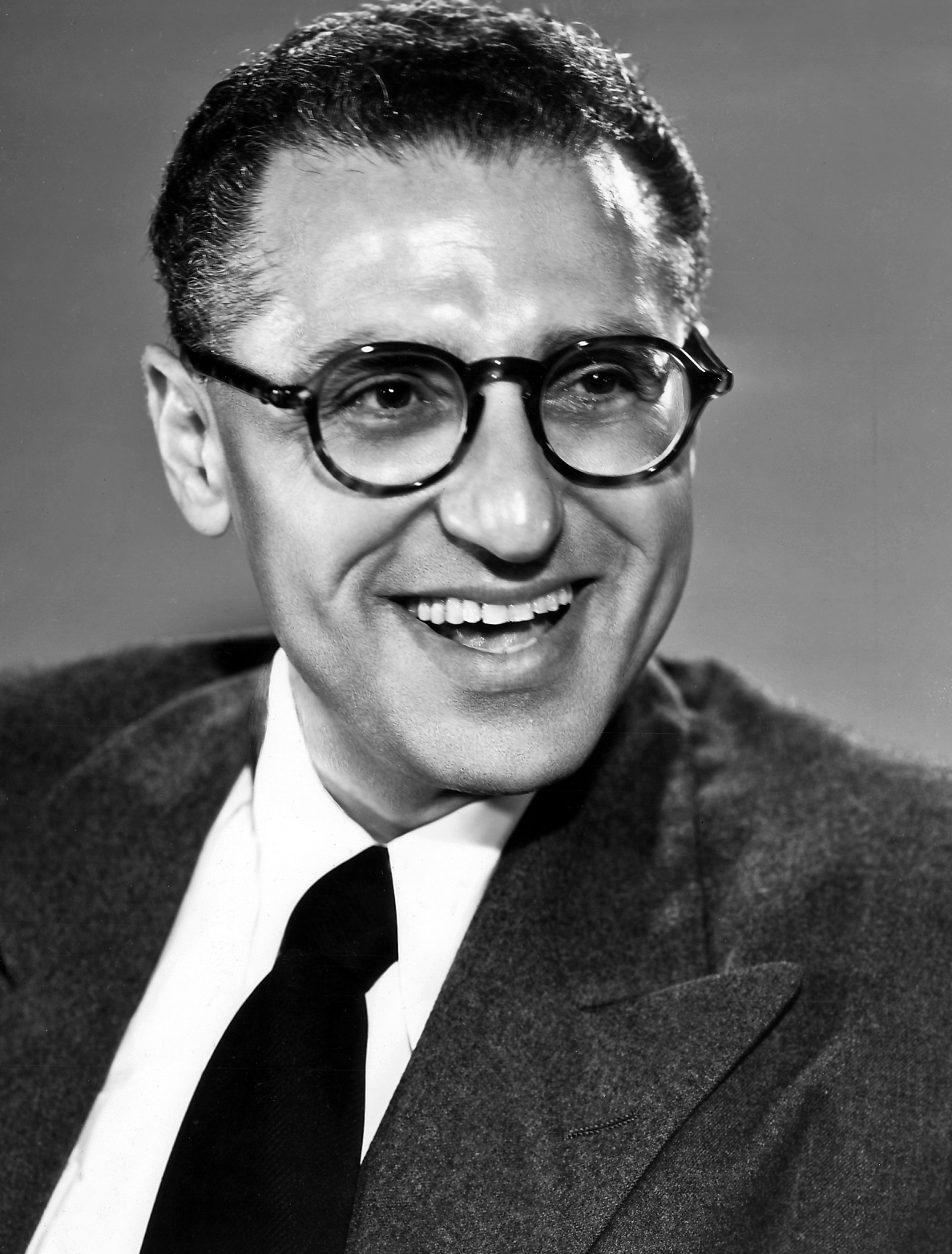
The director of the film, George Cukor, was highly dissatisfied with it

Cukor was highly dissatisfied by the film. "I suspect the story was basically fraudulent", he told an interviewer. Like many critics, he felt that "as a piece of storytelling, the unfolding of a mystery, the first half of Keeper of the Flame is a damn good show", but the rest of the film had substantial problems. He praised Spencer Tracy's work, saying: "Tracy ... was at his best in the picture. Subdued, cool, he conveyed the ruthlessness of the reporter sent to investigate Forrest's death without seeming to try. He was ideally cast in the role, grimly and skeptically exploring the secret of the dead boys' club hero who was in fact a rampant fascist." Hepburn, he felt, was hindered by the role and her approach to it. "It was Kate's last romantic glamour-girl part, and she acted with some of that artificiality she'd supposedly left behind at RKO. That first scene, floating into a room in yards and yards of draperies with these lillies—well, it was all far, far too much. I don't think I really believed in the story, it was pure hokeypokey, and her part was phony, highfalutin." But he felt Hepburn did her best: "That's awfully tricky, isn't it? And doesn't she give long, piercing looks at his portrait over the mantel? Well. I think she finally carried a slightly phony part because her humanity asserted itself, and her humor. They always did." Overall, though, Cukor felt the film was leaden, and that it had "a wax work quality". Even screenwriter Stewart eventually came to feel the film was "tedious, wooden, and heavy-handed".

The technical quality of Keeper of the Flame has been highly praised since its release. The William H. Daniels cinematography and lighting design has been described as lush and virtuosic, and he received accolades from his peers for his work on the film. Cukor biographer and film critic Emanuel Levy praised the strong atmosphere of Keeper of the Flame and Cukor's "interesting Gothic style".

== Modern interpretations ==
Decades later, some critics reassessed the film positively and it has been cited as 1943's "great emotional drama". Critics and scholars note that the film is a good example of the type of anti-fascist films produced in America early in World War II.

Historians also have pointed out that the film score is particularly good. For example, one review noted that the music goes silent during the climactic scene in which Christine Forrest reveals her secrets to Steven O'Malley—an effective and unexpected emotional tactic.

Kevin Starr states that the film "remains astonishing in its bold effort to shape American public opinion" and is a film that "preaches a hard-line Popular Front message". Robert Fyne, author of The Hollywood Propaganda of World War II (1997), notes the film's "strong warning to the American people about demagoguery, domestic fascism, and mind control, while praising the virtues of freedom of the press".

One film historian has concluded that Keeper of the Flame is "truly provocative in that it was one of Hollywood's few forays into imagining the possibility of homegrown American Fascism and the crucial damage which can be done to individual rights when inhumane and tyrannical ideas sweep a society through a charismatic leader".

Other authors have noted that the film is different from other anti-fascist films of the period in that it clearly links wealth and fascism and points out the ways in which patriotism may far too easily be turned toward fascist ends.

== Bibliography ==
- Andersen, Christopher P. (1997). An Affair to Remember: the Remarkable Love Story of Katharine Hepburn and Spencer Tracy. New York: William Morrow and Co. ISBN 0-688-15311-9.
- Booker, M. Keith (1999). Film and the American Left: a Research Guide. Santa Barbara, Calif.: Greenwood Publishing Group. ISBN 0-313-30980-9.
- Ceplair, Larry; Englund, Steven (2003). The Inquisition in Hollywood: Politics in the Film Community, 1930–60. Urbana, Ill.: University of Illinois Press. ISBN 0-252-07141-7.
- Davis, Ronald L. (1993). The Glamour Factory: Inside Hollywood's Big Studio System. Southern Methodist University Press. ISBN 978-0-87074-357-3.
- Edwards, Anne (2000). Katharine Hepburn: A Remarkable Woman. New York: Macmillan. ISBN 0-312-20656-9.
- Ehrlich, Matthew C. (2005). Journalism in the Movies. Chicago: University of Illinois. ISBN 978-0-252-07432-5.
- Fyne, Robert (1997). The Hollywood Propaganda of World War II. Scarecrow Press. ISBN 978-0-8108-3310-4.
- Harmetz, Aljean (2002). The Making of Casablanca: Bogart, Bergman, and World War II. New York: Hyperion. ISBN 978-0-7868-8814-6.
- Higham, Charles (2004). Kate: The Life of Katharine Hepburn. New York: W.W. Norton & Company. ISBN 0-393-32598-9.
- Hoffman, Henryk (2000). "A" Western Filmmakers: a Biographical Dictionary of Writers, Directors, Cinematographers, Composers, Actors and Actresses. Jefferson, N.C.: McFarland. ISBN 0-7864-0696-8.
- Koppes, Clayton R.; Black, Gregory D. (1990). Hollywood Goes to War: How Politics, Profits, and Propaganda Shaped World War II Movies. Berkeley, Calif.: University of California Press. ISBN 978-0-520-07161-2.
- Lambert, Gavin (1972). On Cukor. New York: Putnam. ISBN 978-0-399-10925-6.
- Leaming, Barbara (2000). Katharine Hepburn. Milwaukee, Wisc.: Hal Leonard Corporation. ISBN 0-87910-293-4.
- Levy, Emanuel (1994). George Cukor: Master of Elegance : Hollywood's Legendary Director And His Stars. Morrow. ISBN 978-0-688-11246-2.
- Mann, William J. (2001). Behind the Screen: How Gays and Lesbians Shaped Hollywood, 1910–1969. New York: Viking. ISBN 0-670-03017-1. "Behind the Screen: How Gays and Lesbians Shaped Hollywood, 1910-1969."
- Mann, William J. (2006). Kate: The Woman Who Was Hepburn. New York: Henry Holt. ISBN 978-0-8050-7625-7.
- McGilligan, Patrick (1992). George Cukor: A Double Life. New York: Perennial. ISBN 0-06-097520-2.
- McLaughlin, Robert L.; Parry, Sally E. (2006). We'll Always Have the Movies: American Cinema During World War II. Lexington, Ky.: University Press of Kentucky. ISBN 0-8131-2386-0.
- Neve, Brian (1992). Film and Politics in America: A Social Tradition. London: Routledge. ISBN 978-0-415-02620-8.
- Nochimson, Martha (2002). Screen Couple Chemistry: The Power of 2. Arlington, Tex.: University of Texas Press. ISBN 978-0-292-75579-6.
- Nolletti, Arthur (2005). The Cinema of Gosho Heinosuke: Laughter Through Tears. Bloomington, Ind.: Indiana University Press. ISBN 0-253-21725-3.
- Parish, James Robert (January 1, 1978). Hollywood's Great Love Teams. Rainbow Books. ISBN 978-0-89508-004-2.
- Phillips, Gene D. (1999). Major Film Directors of the American and British Cinema. Lehigh Valley, Pa.: Lehigh University Press. ISBN 0-934223-59-9.
- Porter, Darwin (2004). Katharine the Great (1907–1950): A Lifetime of Secrets ... Revealed. New York: Blood Moon Productions. ISBN 0-9748118-0-7.
- Schatz, Thomas (1999). Boom and Bust: American Cinema in the 1940s. Berkeley, Calif.: University of California Press. ISBN 0-520-22130-3.
- Starr, Kevin (2003). Embattled Dreams: California in War and Peace, 1940–1950. New York: Oxford University Press. ISBN 0-19-516897-6.
- Stewart, Donald Ogden (1975). By A Stroke of Luck!: An Autobiography. New York: Paddington Press. ISBN 0-8467-0063-8.
