= The Rebel (1915 film) =

- Poster from Tasmanian release of film
- Directed by: J. E. Mathews
- Written by: J. E. Mathews
- Based on: story by James Bernard Fagan
- Starring: Allen Doone
- Cinematography: Maurice Bertel; A. O. Segerberg
- Production company: Mathews Photo-Play Company
- Release date: 26 June 1915
- Running time: 5 reels
- Country: Australia
- Languages: Silent film English intertitles

The Rebel is a 1915 Australian silent film starring Allen Doone. It is considered a lost film.

== Plot ==
The Irish rebel leader Jack Blake is arrested and thrown into gaol by the vindictive Englishman Captain Armstrong. Jack's girlfriend, Eileen, helps him escape and he kills Armstrong in a duel. Jack and Eileen flee to France.

== Cast ==
- Allen Doone as Jack Blake
- Edna Keeley as Eileen McDermott
- Frank Cullinane as Squire McDermott
- Onslow Edgeworth as Captain Armstrong
- Percy Kehoe as Father Kelly

== Production ==
This film was based on a stage show which had been performed on stage since November 1913 by Allen Doone.

Raymond Longford claimed Allen Doone approached him to direct the film but that Australasian Films would not let the producers rent out their Rushcutters Bay Studio with Longford attached due to their clashes with Longford resulting from the exhibition of films such as The Silence of Dean Maitland; he was replaced by American John Matthews.

It was shot in and around Sydney over six weeks from April to May 1915. The movie only received limited distribution.
