= The Great Rescue =

1907 play by Bland Holt

The Great Rescue is a 1907 Australian play by Bland Holt.

It was one of the most successful early Australian plays and one of Holt's best known.

The play was based on Lincoln Carter's American story Bedford's Hope. It was adapted to be set in Australia and to refer to the rescue of Modesto Varischetti. George Darrell also wrote a play on this called The Land of Gold.

It featured considerable spectacle on stage including a train.
