= Edna Keeley =

American actress (1884–1961)

Edna Keeley (1884–1961) was a stage actress who also appeared in an Australian silent film.

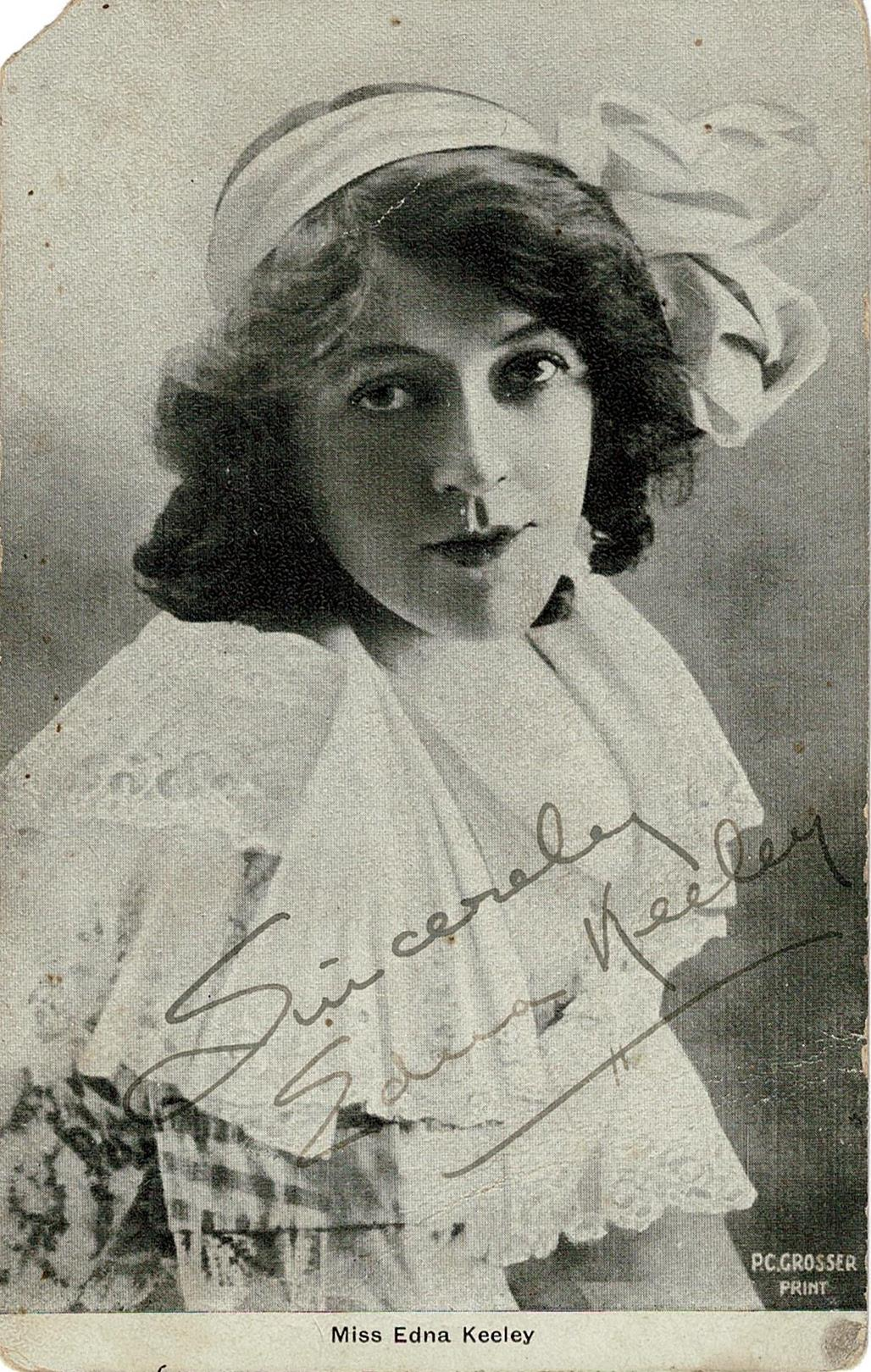
Edna Keeley around 1912

== Life and career ==
Edna Keeley was born in North Dakota in April 1884. She performed on stage as a child actress with her mother Marguerite De Estes.

Keeley was married to George A. Archibald on 12 July 1902 in Marin, California. Archibald died in December of the same year.

Keeley continued working as an actress, and joined the Allen Doone Company which was based in Australia. In 1915 Edna starred in an Australian silent film, The Rebel.

She and Allen Doone returned to the United States, and at the time of his death in 1948, they were married.

Keeley died on 27 January 1961 in Arizona.
