= Modesto Varischetti =

Italian miner who survived being trapped in a flooded mine

- Born: 24 October 1874; Gorno, Lombardy, Italy
- Died: 3 September 1920 (aged 45); Kalgoorlie, Western Australia
- Resting place: Kalgoorlie Cemetery
- Other name: Charlie Varischetti
- Occupation: Gold miner
- Known for: Surviving nine days trapped in the flooded Westralia mine at Bonnievale in 1907

Modesto Varischetti (24 October 1874 – 3 September 1920), known in Australia as Charlie Varischetti, was an Italian-born gold miner who survived for nine days trapped in an air pocket in the flooded Westralia and Eastern Extension gold mine at Bonnievale, near Coolgardie, Western Australia, in March 1907. He was supplied with food and light by divers who descended through the flooded mine and walked free after 206 hours underground. The incident was reported widely worldwide, with Varischetti dubbed "the entombed man". The rescue is regarded as one of the most legendary in Australian mining history.

== Biography ==
Varischetti was born in Gorno, in northern Italy, near Milan. The region was a well known mining area and he became a miner at age 13. He married his wife Maria and had five children, but like others in the poor region, he (along with two of his brothers) left Italy to earn better money in Australia.

Arriving in February 1900, he first worked in Clunes, Victoria. He traveled to Italy again, before returning in 1903 and being attracted to the Westralia & Eastern Extension Mine in Bonnievale. While there, his wife died in 1905, compelling him to make a return trip to Italy a third time. By October 1906, he was back in Bonnievale.

== Mine flood ==
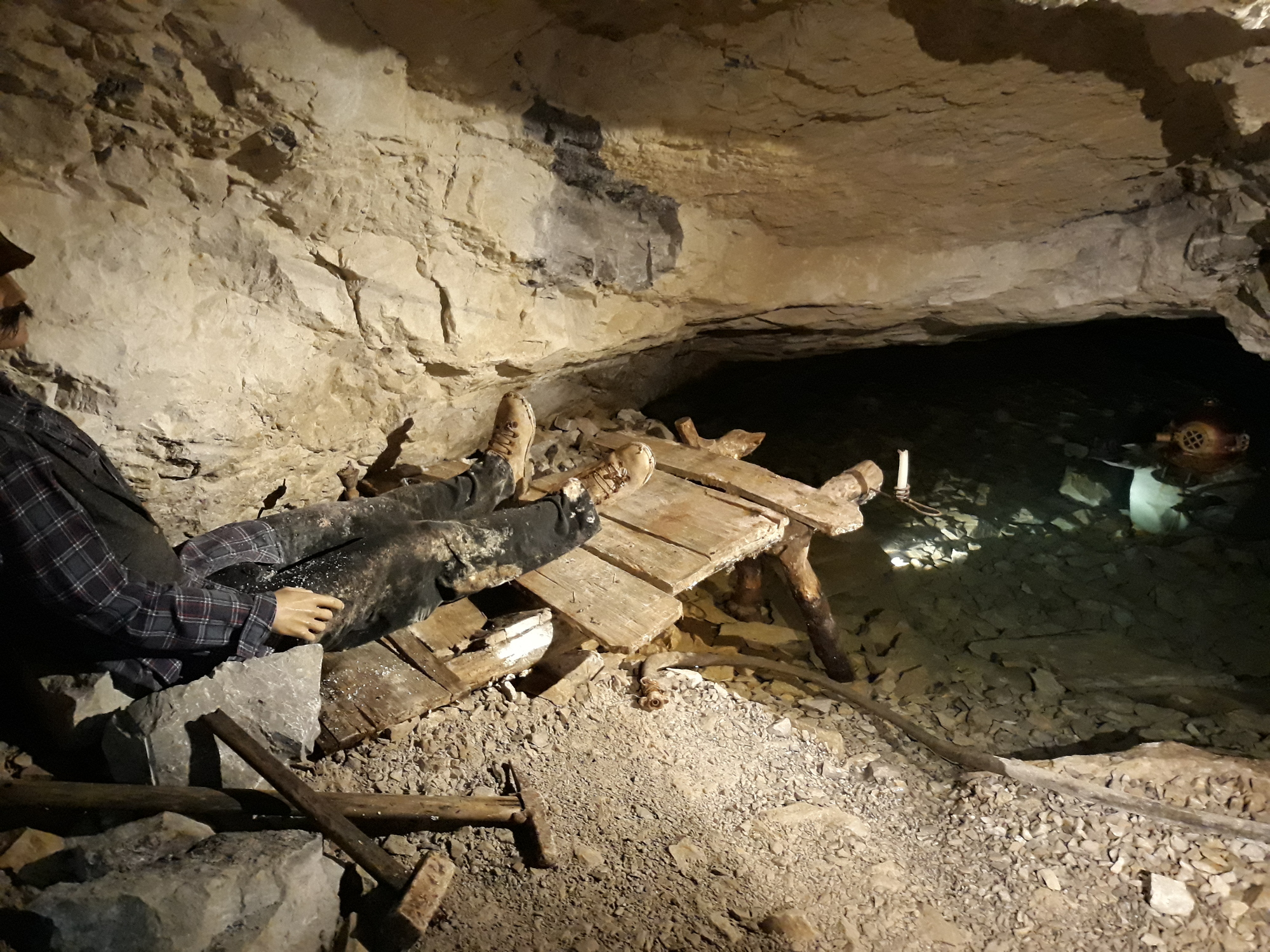
The rescue of Modesto Varischetti, reconstruction from Ecomuseo delle Miniere di Gorno (Ecomuseum of Gorno's Mines)

The mine was located between two valleys, but there was little concern for flooding due to the extremely dry local conditions. However, an unusual thunderstorm on the afternoon of 19 March dumped a year's worth of rainfall in just a few hours. Floodwater funnelled down the mine's unprotected openings, carrying silt, timber and other debris; an estimated 13 million litres of water entered the workings, inundating the lowest levels.

The other miners underground fought their way up ladders to safety, but Varischetti, who was working alone in a rise (an upward-angled working) above the No. 10 level (about 980 feet (300 m) below the surface), did not hear the warnings and was cut off by the rising water. Varischetti was at first presumed to have drowned The following day, rescuers on the No. 9 level heard tapping in reply to their hammer blows on the rock and realised that Varishchetti was alive. Compressed air trapped by the floodwater had formed an air pocket that held the water back, and Varishchetti had survived by retreating into it.

== The rescue ==
The local Inspector of Mines, Josiah Crabb, directed the rescue, with pumping and mine equipment able to slowly lower the water level. Crabb decided to use divers to keep Varischetti supplied until the water could be brought down far enough for him to be brought out after the suggestion prompted by Crabb's seven-year-old son. Two local miners with diving experience, Frank Hughes and a man named Fox, volunteered. Professional divers Tom Hearne and Jack Curtis, with assistants, diving gear and the nearest sufficiently long air hose, were rushed from Fremantle on a specially commissioned train, the "Rescue Special", which covered the roughly 565 kilometres (351 mi) to Coolgardie in record time.

The divers first reached Varischetti five days after the flooding and provided him with food, clothes, candles, messages, and letters of encouragement. The divers visited daily while pumps worked around the clock. Two local doctors, Robert Mitchell and Henry Ellis, monitored the divers and the trapped man's condition throughout the operation. On 28 March 1907, after nine days and 206 hours underground, the water level was finally low enough. With the water lowered to shoulder height in the No. 10 level, Hughes waded to the rise without his diving suit, tied a lifeline around Varischetti's waist and brought him out, carrying him after he collapsed in the cold water.

Herbert Hoover, who would later become President of the United States of America, was a mining engineer at nearby Kanowna and is said to have been involved in the mine rescue.

== Later life and death ==
After his rescue, Varischetti was briefly feted, recovered, and returned to mining. He died 13 years later, at the age of 46, from fibrosis. He is buried in the Kalgoorlie Cemetery.

== Legacy ==
The rescue was followed throughout Australia and overseas. Public subscriptions and testimonials were raised for the divers; Hughes was awarded the Albert Medal (second class) and the Clarke Medal for bravery of the Royal Humane Society of Australasia, and the Western Australian Minister for Mines, Henry Gregory, was decorated by the King of Italy.

The rescue inspired two Australian plays staged within months of the event: Bland Holt's spectacle The Great Rescue (1907), adapted from an American melodrama and reset in Australia to refer to the Varischetti rescue. George Darrell also wrote a play called The Land of Gold (1907)

Varischetti's grave is marked by a headstone erected in 1987 and is part of a heritage walk trail devised by the Kalgoorlie-Boulder Cemetery Board. The Diving gear used in the rescue is displayed in the museum at the Coolgardie Railway Station, and the story features in the Western Australian Museum's history of the goldfields. In his home town of Gorno, the rescue is commemorated by the Ecomuseo delle Miniere di Gorno, which includes a reconstruction of the rescue.

Australian folk group Cloudstreet tells Modesto Varischetti's story in a song. A folk song about the rescue, Down in the Goldmine, set to the English song Down in the Coalmine, was collected in the booklet Moondyne Joe and other Sandgroper Ballads and has been recorded by the Australian folk group Cloudstreet.

Tom Austen's book The Entombed Miner (1986) gives a full account of the rescue, which is also recounted in Malcolm Uren's goldfields history Glint of Gold.

The Italian–Australian documentary ''My Name is Charlie'' (2014), directed by Valeria Messina and Daniele Gastoldi, tells Varischetti's story through interviews with miners in Gorno and Australia. The story was the subject of a 2022 episode of the history podcast Forgotten Australia and of Julia Lawrinson's verse novel for children, Trapped! The Entombed Miner of Bonnie Vale.

The rescue has remained a reference point in later Australian mine emergencies. When the Emu mine at Agnew flooded in 1989, police divers were sent down in the hope that the missing men had survived in an air pocket "like Modesto Varischetti", and the story attracted renewed attention during the 2006 Beaconsfield mine rescue in Tasmania, alongside which it is often ranked.
