= J. E. Mathews =

American film director

- Born: John E. Mathews
- Occupation: Film director

John E. Mathews was an American film director who worked briefly in Australia during the silent period. He also ran an acting school.

== Select filmography ==
- The Unknown (1915) – short
- The Rebel (1915)
- The Heart of a Champion (1915) – documentary about Les Darcy
- Murphy of Anzac (1916)
- Remorse, a Story of the Red Plague (1917)
