= Bonnie Vale, Western Australia =

Abandoned town in Western Australia

Bonnie Vale
- Town
- Coordinates: 30.856°S 121.162°E
- Country: Australia
- State: Western Australia
- LGA: Shire of Coolgardie
- Location: 570 km (350 mi) ENE of Perth, Western Australia; 12 km (7.5 mi) north of Coolgardie
- Established: 1897

Government
  - State electorate: Eyre
  - Federal division: O'Connor
- Elevation: 375 m (1,230 ft)
- Postcode: 6430

Bonnie Vale is an abandoned goldfields townsite 14 km (8.7 mi) north of Coolgardie in the Shire of Coolgardie in Western Australia.

== History ==
The town was gazetted in 1897. It was apparently named after Bonnie, a prospector who picked up a 7-troy-ounce (220 g) nugget here in May/June 1894.

It is famous as the site of the Varischetti mine rescue of 1907, when Italian gold miner Modesto Varischetti was trapped for nine days in a mine when it was flooded after a thunderstorm. Varischetti survived in an air pocket until rescued. A diver using deep-sea diving equipment located Varischetti five days after the mine was flooded, and provided him with food, candles and letters of encouragement.

== Rail services ==
Transwa's Prospector service, which runs each way between East Perth and Kalgoorlie once or twice each day, stops at Bonnie Vale.
