= I. A. R. Wylie =

Australian-British writer and poet (1885–1959)

I.A.R. Wylie
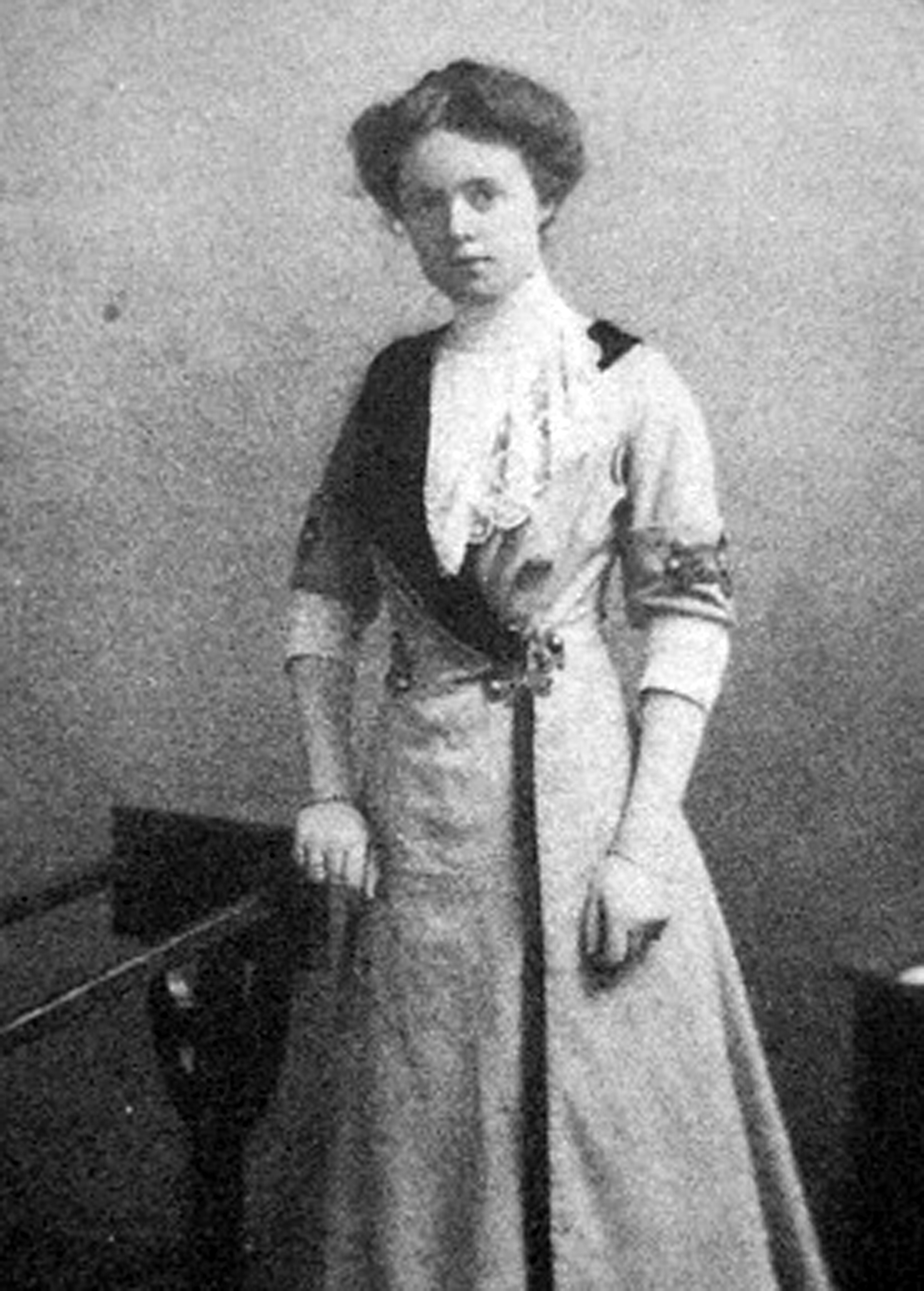
- I.A.R. Wylie in Germany, c. 1910
- Born: Ida Alexa Ross Wylie; 16 March 1885; Melbourne, Australia
- Died: 4 November 1959 (aged 74); Princeton, New Jersey, USA
- Other name: Ida Alena Ross Wylie
- Occupations: Writer, poet

Ida Alexa Ross Wylie (16 March 1885 – 4 November 1959), known by her pen name I.A.R. Wylie, was an Australian-British-American novelist, screenwriter, short story writer, poet, and suffragette sympathiser, who was honoured by the journalistic and literary establishments of her time and received international recognition for her works. Between 1915 and 1953, more than 30 of her novels and stories were adapted into films, including Keeper of the Flame (1942), which was directed by George Cukor and starred Spencer Tracy and Katharine Hepburn.

== Biography ==
=== Early life ===
Wylie was born Ida Alexa Ross Wylie on 16 March 1885 in Melbourne, Australia, to Alexander Coghill Wylie (1852–1910) from England and Ida Millicent Ross (1855–1890), a farmer's daughter from Australia. I.A.R. Wylie's father, Alec Wylie of Glasgow, Scotland, was in debt much of his life and often on the move from creditors. Sometime in the 1880s, though, after failing to be elected as an MP, he fled the UK for Australia, but not before his first wife divorced him in 1883 for adultery and violence, winning custody of their two children and also proposing to her sister, Christine (who refused). In Australia, he soon married a farmer's daughter named Ida Ross. The couple's first child, I.A.R. Wylie, was born in Melbourne in 1885, literally named after her parents: Ida Ross and Alec Wylie. In 1888, Alec moved back to London with his new wife and young child, but Ida Ross died shortly thereafter. According to Ida's book Life with George, an "unconventional autobiography", Alec then renewed relations with Christine, his first wife's sister, and Christine became the young Wylie's home school teacher and guardian, raising her while her father struggled from one crisis to the next. At one point, young Ida briefly attended Cheltenham Ladies College. In terms of influence on her development, "Christine was just the first of a line of women who proved far stronger and more reliable than any man in Ida's life." However, marriage records show Wylie's third marriage was to Adela Maude B de Burgh Lawson, daughter of Sir Henry de Burgh Lawson of Gatherley Castle; it may be Adela who is Christine (Wylie's first marriage was to Emillie Isabel Roumieu).

=== Early writing career ===
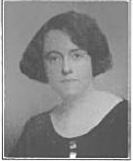
Ida R. Wylie

After spending three years in finishing school in Belgium, Wylie first studied in England, and later in Germany, where she also taught and began writing. Wylie's self-education at home meant she spent many hours making up her own stories to fill up time, and at the age of 19, she sold her first short story to a magazine. For example, Wylie had a roommate named Esme, who had been raised in India, so she wrote stories based on Esme's reminisces. Wylie went on to write at least five books based in India, The Native Born, or, The Rajah's People (1910), The Daughter of Brahma (1913), Tristram Sahib (1915), The Temple of Dawn (1915), and The Hermit Doctor of Gaya (1916). While living in Germany in the early 1910s, she wrote a number of books, including My German Year (1910), Rambles in the Black Forest (1911), The Germans (1911), and Eight Years in Germany (1914). Her novel, Towards Morning (1918), was "perhaps the first in English to suggest that not all Germans were evil imperialists."

=== Role in suffragette movement ===
In 1911, Wylie returned to England, living in St John's Wood, London, and joined the suffragette movement. She provided a safe house for women who were released from prison, where they could recover from hunger strikes under the "Cat and Mouse Act" without being watched by the police. She struck up a relationship with the editor of The Suffragette, Rachel Barrett, and by mid 1913, was a useful "subeditor and bottle-washer". She traveled with Annie and Jessie Kenney and Mary Richardson to spend a week in France with Christabel Pankhurst. Wylie and Barrett then traveled to Edinburgh to Wylie's aunt Jane, where Barrett had surgery and lived under a pseudonym to avoid rearrest. Both returned to London for Christmas 1913 and continued to secretly edit The Suffragette until May 1914, when police again raided the premises in Lincoln's Inn. In 1917, Barrett and Wylie traveled to America. They bought a car and roamed around the country, from New York City to San Francisco, a remarkable journey with the state of roads and cars at the time.

=== Hollywood ===
Wylie eventually settled in Hollywood, California, where she sold her stories. Over 30 movies were made from 1915 to 1953 based on her works, including Phone Call from a Stranger (1952) and Torch Song (1953). Her story "Grandmother Bernle Learns Her Letters", published in the Saturday Evening Post in 1926, was filmed twice, by John Ford in 1928 as Four Sons and by Archie Mayo in 1940, also as Four Sons. She is probably best known as the author of the novel that became the basis of the film Keeper of the Flame (1942), directed by George Cukor and starring Spencer Tracy and Katharine Hepburn.

=== Personal life ===
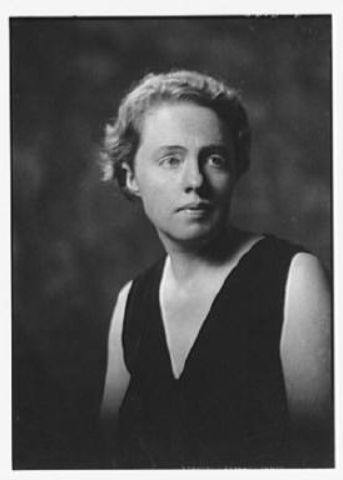
I. A. R. Wylie, December 1928. Photo: Arnold Genthe

Wylie became involved with physician Sara Josephine Baker. Neither Baker nor Wylie ever declared herself openly as a lesbian, but according to Dr. Bert Hansen, the two women were partners. Other authors have identified her as a lesbian, including Laura Doan and Barbara Grier.

In her autobiography My Life with George, in which the "George" of the title is her subconscious ego, Wylie says:

I have always liked women better than men. I am more at ease with them and more amused by them. I too am rather bored by a conventional relationship which seems to involve either my playing up to someone or playing down to someone. Here and there and especially in my latter years when there should be no further danger of my trying to ensnare one of them I have established some real friendships with men in which we meet and like each other on equal terms as human beings. But fortunately, I have never wanted to marry any of them, nor with the exception of that one misguided German Grenadier, have any of them wanted to marry me.

In her autobiography, she acknowledges that many of her women friends refer to her as "Uncle", and as one critic says, her choice of being credited as "I.A.R. Wylie" instead of Ida Wylie was certainly an attempt to downplay her gender in publications.

In the 1930s, Wylie, Sara Josephine Baker, and another pioneering woman physician, Dr. Louise Pearce, settled on a property near Skillman, New Jersey, named Trevenna Farm. They lived there together until Baker died in 1945, followed by Pearce, and then later Wylie, who died on 4 November 1959 at the age of 74. Wylie and Pearce are buried alongside each other at Henry Skillman Burying Ground, Trevenna Farm's family cemetery.

== Works ==
- The Native Born, or, The Rajah's People (1910)
- My German Year (1910)
- Rambles in the Black Forest (1911)
- The Germans (1911)
- Dividing Waters (1911)
- In Different Keys (1911)
- The Daughter of Brahma (1913)
- The Red Mirage (1913)
- The Paupers of Portman Square (1913)
- Five Years to Find Out (1914)
- Eight Years in Germany (1914)
- Tristram Sahib (1915)
- The Temple of Dawn (1915)
- Happy Endings (1915)
- The Hermit Doctor of Gaya (1916)
- Armchair Stories (1916)
- The Duchess in Pursuit (1917)
- Toward Morning (1918)
- The Shining Heights (1918)
- All Sorts (1919)
- Holy Fire: And Other Stories (1920)
- Children of Storm (1920)
- Brodie and the Deep Sea (1920)
- Rogues & Company (1921)
- The Dark House (1922)
- Jungle Law (1923)
- Side Shows (1923)
- Ancient Fires (1924)
- Black Harvest (1926)
- The Mad Busman, and Other Stories (1926)
- The Silver Virgin (1929)
- Some Other Beauty (1930)
- The Things We Do, and Other Stories (1932)
- Prelude to Richard (1934)
- To The Vanquished (1934)
- A Feather in Her Hat (1934)
- The Novels of Elinor Wylie (1934)
- The Inheritors, and With Their Eyes Open (1936)
- Furious Young Man (1936)
- The Underpup (1938)
- The Young in Heart (1938)
- My Life With George: An Unconventional Autobiography (1940)
- Strangers Are Coming (1941)
- Keeper of the Flame (1942)
- Flight to England (1943)
- Ho, the Fair Wind (1945)
- Storm in April (1946)
- Where No Birds Sing (1947)
- Candles for Therese (1951)
- The Undefeated (1957)
- Home Are the Hunted (1959)
- Claire Serrat (1959)
