= The Unknown (1915 comedy film) =

- Directed by: J. E. Mathews
- Produced by: Archie Fraser; Colin Fraser
- Starring: Peter Felix; Porky Keans
- Production company: Fraser Film Release and Photographic Company
- Distributed by: Fraser Film Release and Photographic Company
- Release date: 1 February 1915
- Running time: 2,000 feet
- Country: Australia
- Languages: Silent film English intertitles

The Unknown was a 1915 film directed by J. E. Mathews released in support of The Sunny South or The Whirlwind of Fate (1915).

It is considered a lost film.

== Cast ==
- Jack Kearns
- Mick King
- Peter Felix
- Jeff Smith
- Frank Longhrey

== Production ==
The movie was shot in Newcastle over December 1914 and January 1915.

It starred two boxers and vaudeville star Jack Kearns.

== Reception ==
The film premiered at Waddington's Globe Theatre, George Street in Sydney. According to the Referee "Mick King, Herr Kearns, and Peter Felix have, in this picture, displayed surprising histrionic ability."

The Motion Picture News called it "a really good comedy, Keystone in appearance".
