= Agnes Gavin =

Australian actor and screenwriter

Agnes Gavin (1872–1947), was an Australian actor and screenwriter in the silent film era. She worked in collaboration with her husband John Gavin throughout her career. She wrote the majority of his films and was arguably the first specialist screenwriter in the history of the Australian film industry. In newspapers she was advertised as the "well known picture dramatizer" and was praised for creating "cleverly constructed stories". Many of her films are considered lost.

== Early life ==
She was born in Sydney as Agnes Adele Wangenheim. At the age of eighteen, she married Barnett Kurtz, and became Agnes Kurtz. Barnett Kurtz had attempted to divorce Agnes in March 1897. Kurtz read a letter to the court in which Agnes said she wanted a divorce; Agnes said she did not want to divorce and wrote the letter just to annoy her husband; the divorce was not granted. In December 1897 Agnes sued for the divorce on the grounds of adultery by her husband and it was granted. Their divorce was highly publicized.

On 3 October 1898 Agnes married stage actor John Gavin, and for many years they worked together in Vaudeville and Bland Holt's stage company.

In 1904, Agnes Gavin was accused of abusing her neighbor with violent language, as well as menacing her with a hammer and threatening to chop down her door with an ax. The court ordered her bound to the peace for six months.

In her first marriage she had a daughter named Isadore, who died on 12 September 1913. John Gavin died in 1938 and Agnes followed in 1947. The couple is survived by two daughters and several grandchildren.

== Career ==
In 1910, Gavin and her husband made their first film together, Thunderbolt, produced by H. A. Forsyth. John Gavin played the main character. In their next film with Forsyth, Moonlite, Gavin played an aboriginal girl named Bunda Bunda while wearing blackface.

Agnes Gavin then went on to write several films for Crick and Finlay, which her husband directed.

In 1911, her husband started his own production company, the Gavin Photo-Play Studio. She wrote the films he directed, occasionally playing in them alongside her husband.

The pair were best known for making films about bushrangers such as Captain Thunderbolt, Captain Moonlite, Ben Hall and Frank Gardiner, and convict-era melodramas.

An article about the making of Ben Hall said the "dramatisation of the book" was in her "capable hands."

She adapted her 1917 film The Murder of Captain Fryatt into a play: Captain Fryatt; Or, For King and Country.

In 1918 she and her husband moved to Hollywood, returning briefly to Australia in 1922 and then permanently in 1925.

== Filmography ==
- Thunderbolt (1910)
- Moonlite (1910) (also known as: Captain Moonlite)
- Ben Hall and his Gang (1911)
- Frank Gardiner, the King of the Road (1911)
- Keane of Kalgoorlie (1911)
- The Mark of the Lash (1911)
- The Drover's Sweetheart (1911)
- Assigned to his Wife (1911)
- The Assigned Servant (1911)
- An Interrupted Divorce (1916)
- Charlie at the Sydney Show (1916)
- The Martyrdom of Nurse Cavell (1916)
- The Murder of Captain Fryatt (1917)
- His Convict Bride (1918) (also known as: For the Term of Her Natural Life)
- Trooper O'Brien (1928) (originally The Key of Fate)

== Scripts ==
- The White Hope (announced 1911)
- Outlaw Ned Kelly and His Gang (registered on 27 December 1917)
- Binda's Mistress of the Girl of the Soil (registered in 1930)

== Books ==
- Golden Heart, or Odds On (1923)
- Money Down Brown (1926)

== Plays ==
- Captain Fryatt; or, for king and country : dramatised from the scenario (1917)
