= Ben Hall and His Gang =

1911 film

Ben Hall and his Gang
- Referee 4 January 1911
- Directed by: John Gavin
- Written by: Agnes Gavin
- Produced by: Herbert Finlay; Stanley Crick
- Starring: John Gavin; Agnes Gavin
- Cinematography: Herbert Finlay
- Production companies: Crick and Finlay
- Distributed by: J.G. Films
- Release date: 30 January 1911
- Running time: 3,600 feet
- Country: Australia
- Languages: Silent; English intertitles

Ben Hall and his Gang is a 1911 Australian film about the bushranger Ben Hall, played by John Gavin, who also directed. It is considered a lost film.

The movie was part of the Australian "bushranger film" cycle from 1910-1912.

== Plot ==
According to The Sun "This bushranging drama teems with sensational episodes, beginning with the blighted hopes of Ben Hall, which loads to his buohranging career. The chief incidents illustrated Include the sticking up of the Keightley home stead, the Eugowra Mail Robbery, and the romantic meeting with Susannah Glynn, who shares in some of Ben Hall's most thrilling escapes from the police."

Specific chapters included:

- Ben Hall's home.
- My Child! My Child! You Have No Mother
- Ben Gambling to Forget his Sorrows.
- Ben Hall arrested.
- His First Crime.
- Ben Hall's sensational escape from Bathurst Gaol.
- Sticking up three police disguised as shearers.
- Ben Hall's first robbery under arms.
- Sticking up the Eugowra Mail.
- Black Bob shot.
- The Trooper's leap for life.
- Hall meeting his false friend.
- The Wages of Sin.

== Cast ==
- John Gavin as Ben Hall
- Alf Scarlett
- Mr. Mainsbridge, wife and daughter
- Charlie Lay
- John ("Fatty") Harris

== Production ==
Gavin had made two successful bushranger biopic movies in association with H.A. Forsyth, Thunderbolt and Moonlite. However on 24 December 1910 (before Moonlite had been released) Gavin announced he had Forsyth had parted ways and he would be making a new film, a version of the Ben Hall story, through his own company. He eventually formed a new partnership with the producing team of Stanley Crick and Herbert Finlay. Crick and Finlay were based out of offices at 75 York St Sydney.

On 9 January Gavin announced that the film was almost completed, and he was preparing a new bushranger biopic, about Frank Gardiner.

== Reception ==
The film performed well at the box office.

Gavin went on to make three more films for Crick and Finlay (Frank Gardiner, the King of the Road (1911), Keane of Kalgoorlie (1911), The Assigned Servant (1911)), and one for their new company, the Australian Photo-Play Company (The Mark of the Lash (1911)).
