= His Convict Bride =

- Theatrical release poster
- Directed by: John Gavin
- Written by: Agnes Gavin
- Starring: John Gavin
- Cinematography: Lacey Percival
- Production company: Australian Famous Feature Company
- Distributed by: John Gavin
- Release date: 4 February 1918
- Country: Australia
- Language: Silent film

His Convict Bride is a 1918 Australian silent film from the team of John and Agnes Gavin. It was a convict-era melodrama.

== Plot ==
In 1813 England, Bess Shelgrove rejects a suitor, Adam Wilson who works as a bank clerk. Seeking revenge, Adam steals money from the bank and frames Bess. She is arrested and transported to Botany Bay where she is assigned as a servant to the snobbish Mrs Renshay.

Mrs Renshay has a dodgy son and Bess escapes into the bush, where she meets and marries Jack Warren. Bess is later recognised by Mrs Renshay and is arrested. Jack encounters Adam Wilson and forces him to confess he framed Tess. Bess is released from prison and is reunited with Jack and their baby daughter.

== Cast ==
- Ethel Bashford as Bess Shelgrove
- John Gavin as Jack Warren
- Charles Villiers as Adam Wilson
- Frank Hawthorne
- Claude Turton
- Fred Cope
- Syd Everett
- Walter Vincent
- Ray Harris
- C. Howard
- D.L. Dalziel
- Randal Woodhouse
- Ruth Wainwright
- Rose Rooney
- Flo Smith

== Production ==
The movie was originally known as Sentenced For Life then For the Term of Her Natural Life; the second title was withdrawn after the threat of legal action by Marcus Clarke's daughter due to its similarity to the novel For the Term of His Natural Life. However, the film is more inspired by the Gavin's previous colonial works, Assigned to his Wife (1911) and The Assigned Servant (1911). It was allegedly based on a true story.

Agnes Gavin copyrighted her script on 20 September 1917.

Shooting began in September 1917 in and around Sydney, including at Gavin's studio in Pitt Street. While filming a scene in Penrith, a horse backed over a forty-foot cliff with John Gavin on it. He had his fall broken by a tree and was rescued with a block and tackle, but the horse was put down.

Gavin made the film aimed at the American market.

== Reception ==
The film critic from The Sunday Times gave the movie a mixed review:

His Convict Bride fails to reach even the very low standard of plot set by Australian producers – a circumstance which is difficult to overlook, considering that this country has no scarcity of 'writing talent. But the really surprising part of this film is the photography, from which all signs of crudeness have vanished. The settings are varied and clearly projected; the effects of light and shade have been considered; there are even close-up views of the players, and scenes that fade away in the most approved manner. And a truly professional touch is evident in the hero's visions. While not elaborate, the camera work, taken as a whole, can compare with that of any American picture, and, with this branch of the industry mastered, prospects look brighter for further development. The sub-titles, too, being illustrated are more ambitious than usual. Two-thirds of them, however, could have been eliminated, and a little thought would have suggested better word ing for the rest. As they stand, they bear all the dead and gone phrases upon which stage melodrama props its dialogue... Jack Gavin... gives a striking impersonation... and in Ethel Bashford he has chosen a singularly promising, actress for the title-role.

Gavin later claimed he had to pay 6d per foot to get the film into America. After the movie was made, the Gavins moved to Hollywood for several years to work before returning in 1925.
