= The Drover's Sweetheart =

- Directed by: John Gavin
- Written by: Agnes Gavin
- Produced by: John Gavin
- Starring: John Gavin; Agnes Gavin
- Cinematography: A. J. Moulton
- Production company: John F. Gavin Productions
- Release date: August 1911
- Running time: over 3,000 feet
- Country: Australia
- Language: Silent film

The Drover's Sweetheart is a 1911 film from the team of Agnes and John Gavin.

It was the first film they made for their own production company after leaving Stanley Crick and Herbert Finlay on 19 July 1911 and seems to have been made at Gavin's new studios at Waverly. He paid for advertisements saying it was the first film he made after leaving the Australian Photoplay COmpany.

Very little is known about the movie, which is considered a lost film. It is not certain if it was ever even released commercially. It appears to have received some screenings in 1912.

The film was supposed to be followed by another from Gavin called The Lubra's Revenge but is unclear if this was made.

It may have a link with the Australian play The Drover's Sweetheart and/or the poem by Henry Lawson of the same name.
