= Moonlite =

1910 film

- Sydney Sportsman 28 December 1910
- Directed by: John Gavin
- Written by: H. A. Forsyth or Agnes Gavin
- Based on: the play Captain Moonlight by W. J. Lincoln
- Produced by: H. A. Forsyth
- Starring: John Gavin; Agnes Gavin
- Cinematography: A. J. Moulton
- Production company: Southern Cross Film Enterprise
- Release date: 31 December 1910 (Sydney)
- Running time: 4,000 feet
- Country: Australia
- Languages: Silent; English intertitles
- Budget: £1,000

Moonlite is a 1910 Australian bushranger film about Captain Moonlite, played by John Gavin, who also directed for producer H.A. Forsyth. It was also known as Captain Moonlite and is considered a lost film.

It followed on the success of an earlier bushranger biopic, Thunderbolt (1910), also made by Gavin and Forsyth, and like that it co-starred Ruby Butler and was shot by A.J. Moulton.

The movie was part of the Australian "bushranger film" cycle from 1910-1912.

== Synopsis ==
In the early 1870s, a New Zealand army officer, Captain George Scott, is caught cheating at cards and brutally beats a fellow officer. Disgraced and discharged, he joins the clergy and falls in love with the beautiful Ruth Clarke, whose brother has embezzled a large amount of money and is going to be arrested. For her sake he robs the Edgerton Bank, and arranges to leave by boat to England. The police arrive as he gets on the boat the Lady Isabelle and although he attempts to swim away he is wounded and arrested. Constables Ryan and Mae have their first case.

Scott later escapes from gaol by strangling a warden and releasing another prisoner. He becomes a bushranger under the name of "Moonlite", forming a gang which includes Ruth's brother. He saves an aboriginal "gin" called Bunda Bunda from drowning, then goes on to rob the gold escort, distributing some of this money to the poor.

Moonlite and his gang go on to stick up a country pub and the police send Inspector Carroll and his men after him. Moonlite's gang hold up Wantabadgery Station, and Carroll gives chase but they are fought off and Bunda Bunda saves Moonlite's life.

Ryan and Mac make a capture, and Bunda Bunda shoots the tracker after Moonlite. Eventually Moonlite is captured at McCreedy's farm after a shootout by Inspector Carroll in which Bunda Bunda is killed. He is taken away to gaol for the last time to be executed. All Ruth is left with is his cross.

The chapter headings were as follows:

1. The Great Military Scene
2. Scott as a Minister
3. Scott Robs the Egerton Bank
4. Ryan and Mac's First Case
5. Scott's Great Escape from the Boat Lady Isabel
6. Scott's Swim: Arrest and Escape from Gaol
7. The Forming of the Gang
8. To the Bush; Scott Saves Bunda Bunda; Bunda Bunda's Swim
9. Gold Escort Robbery
10. Scott's Kindness to the Poor
11. Sticking Up the Roadside Pub
12. Troopers Drilling Under Inspector Carrol
13. Sticking Up Wantabadgery Station
14. Great Police Chase
15. Scott's Strategy and Defeat of Inspector Carrol
16. Ryan and Mac Make a Capture
17. Ryan and Mac Drilling for Duty
18. Young Clarke, the Bushranging bareback Rider
19. Bunda Bunda Shoots the Tracker
20. The Great Fight at McCready's Farm
21. Moonlite's last Journey to Gaol
22. The Cross is All that is Left to Ruth.

== Cast ==
- John Gavin as Captain George Scott/Captain Moonlite
- H. A. Forsyth
- Ruby Butler as Ruth
- Agnes Gavin as Bunda Bunda

== Production ==
Lithgow Mercury 11 Jan 1911

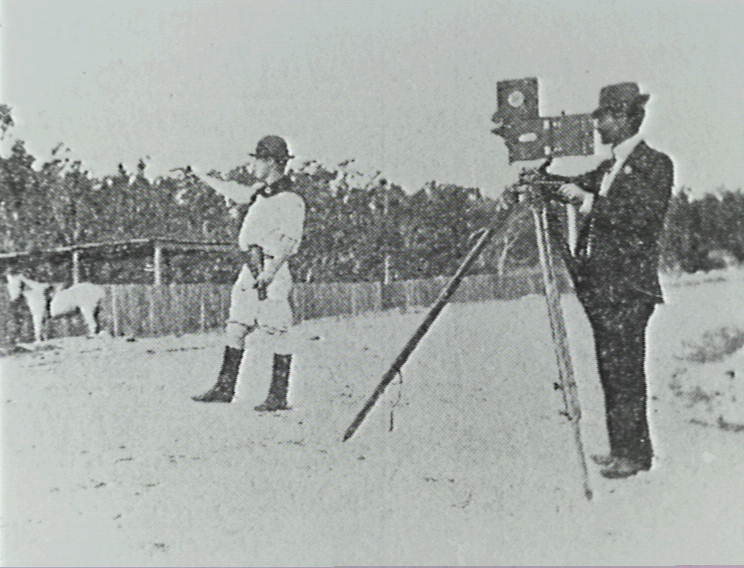
Production still from film

The movie was announced in early December 1910, shortly after the release of Thunderbolt.

The plot appears to have been heavily influenced by the classic novel Robbery Under Arms. Gavin later said the film was the first script written by his wife Agnes, although advertising attributed the story to Forsyth.

The film was shot at Victoria Barracks in Sydney and in the bush around Lithgow in December 1910, with a budget of over £1,000. Lithgow filming was finished by 14 December. Over 200 people were reportedly involved in the film.

Gavin was almost attacked by a shark while shooting an escape sequence near Glebe Island – producer H.A. Forsyth had to throw a dog overboard to distract the shark and save Gavin. According to The Sun:

The general public will hardly realise that quite a fortnight was token in the rehearsing and perfecting and ileal action of the numerous scenes In this long drama, that over 50 actors, 20 horses, a motor car, and a train had to be enlisted to take, part, and that the proprietors of - the picture were forced to obtain the aid of ships' captains, liotcl-kcepers, police authorities, magistrates, farmers, land-owners, and others to bring the picture to a successful issue.

According to some reports the film went for 11,000 feet (over 80 minutes). However most reports put the length of the film at 4,000 feet.

== Release ==
The movie was previewed on 30 December 1910 in Sydney. The Sun said it was "remarkable for clearness of detail".

Screenings of the film were usually accompanied by a lecturer. Many advertisements for the film would mention Forysth but not Gavin.

The first public screening was a sellout. A contemporary account said it and Thunderbolt "have been exhibited in every picture show of note in Australia. According to Gavin, the film was a massive success at the box office. However, Gavin then ended his association with H. A. Forsyth and instead was commissioned to make several films for Stanley Crick and Herbert Finlay, starting with Ben Hall and his Gang (1910).

== Reception ==
According to The Truth "the film is remarkable for its clearness, and is sure to become a great success throughout Australia".

The Sunday Times said "Apart from the question whether any good purpose Is served by glorifying the deeds of the outlaw 'Moonlite' challenges praise from the stand point of realistic photography. All the films are clear and sharp, and the 'chase' effects while the police are in pursuit of Captain Moonlite and his gang are wonderfully well done. In, addition to the 'Moonlite' pictures a number of excel lent cinematograph views of the Sydney Harbor, Darling Harbor, Lane Cove River, and Parramatta River are shown."
