= Bushranger ban =

Ban on bushranger films in Australia (1911–1942)

The bushranger ban was a ban on bushranger films that came into effect in parts of Australia from 1911. Films about bushrangers had been the most popular genre of local films ever since The Story of the Kelly Gang (1906). Governments were concerned about the influence the genre would have on the Australian population and bans against films depicting bushrangers were introduced in South Australia (1911), New South Wales (a 1912 amendment to the New South Wales Theatres and Public Halls Act 1908) and Victoria (1912).

The decision had a considerable impact on the local industry as it meant filmmakers could not work in a popular genre. Australian film production, which in 1911 was one of the most prolific in the world, went into decline as a result. It has been called "one of the most destructive and pointless pieces of legislation in the history of Australian filmmaking."

The ban was still in effect by the 1930s and hampered efforts to make a number of films in the country, including an adaptation of Robbery Under Arms from director Ken G. Hall. A ban on a film about Ned Kelly, When the Kellys Rode (1934), was not lifted until 1942.

Hall's film version of The Squatter's Daughter in 1933 removed a bushranger subplot that was present in the original play. The Hollywood bushranging film Stingaree (1934) was screened in every state of Australia except for New South Wales because of the ban.

== Background ==
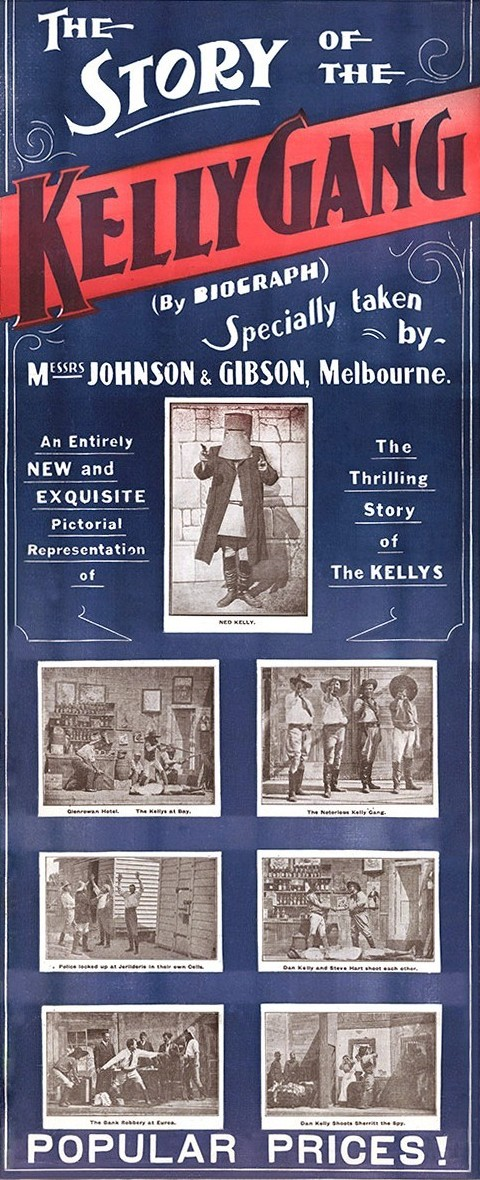
Poster for The Story of the Kelly Gang (1906)

The bushranger genre of Australian film fictionalized the experiences of bushrangers from Australian history. Bushrangers were outlaws, most active in the 19th century, and remembered in Australian folklore for their acts of robbery and violent crime, including murder. The genre showed how the bushrangers' intimate connection with the bush allowed them to skirt the law and engage in outlaw activity. Many of the films made before the ban glorified bushrangers, rather than making them seem criminal.

Early bushranger films include Bushranging in Northern Queensland and Robbery of a Mail Coach by Bushrangers. Both were released in 1904 and ran five minutes long and six minutes long respectively. The Story of the Kelly Gang, about the bushranger Ned Kelly, was released in Melbourne on 26 December 1906. The Story of the Kelly Gang is notable for being the first feature film ever made. At the time of its release, it was considered to be the longest film that had ever been made, running at around seventy to eighty minutes.

Like the majority of the bushranger films that would follow it, The Story of the Kelly Gang was relatively sympathetic to the outlaws whose lives it fictionalized. As a result, the government of Victoria tried to censor it when it was first released, claiming that it was encouraging crime. It was banned in two towns that had a relation to the gang presented in the movie. Despite government discontent, The Story of the Kelly Gang was a major commercial success, both nationally and internationally. One of the producers of the film stated that it made 25,000 pounds, in comparison to its budget of 1000 pounds.

== Bushranger films from 1906 to 1911 ==
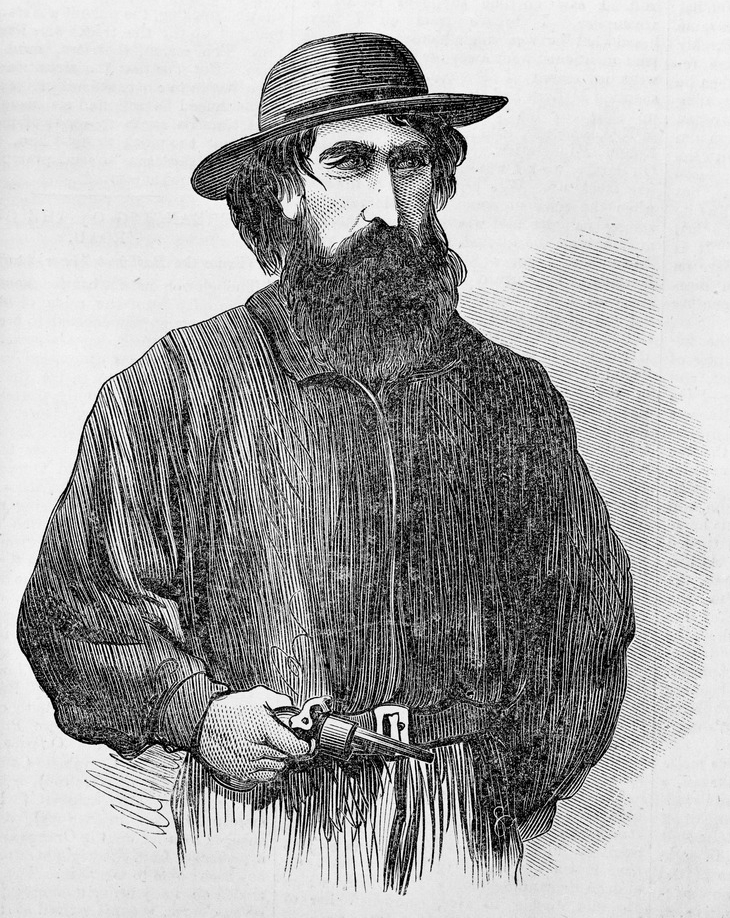
Woodcut print of the bushranger Dan "Mad Dog" Morgan

The success of The Story of the Kelly Gang encouraged filmmakers to produce even more bushranger films. Between 1900 and 1914, one hundred and sixteen bushranger films were made in Australia. Most, if not all, of these films focused on the lives of white male bushrangers. A few of the most significant bushranger films made in this period include Thunderbolt (1910), Captain Midnight, the Bush King (1911), multiple adaptations of the classic bushranger novel Robbery Under Arms, and Dan Morgan (1911). Dan Morgan was notable for depicting its protagonist, the historical outlaw Dan Morgan, as a true criminal, rather than an anti-hero. The graphic violence of Dan Morgan was unlike the content of any bushranger film before it, and it spurred the governments of New South Wales and Victoria to pass regulations on film content the very next year.

== Theatres and Public Halls Act 1912 ==
In 1912, New South Wales's Theatres and Public Halls Act was amended to directly target the content of films. Specifically, the 1912 amendment was meant to prohibit the screening of "objectionable" films – films with

scenes suggestive of immorality or indecency, executions, murders, or other revolting scenes; scenes of debauchery, low habits of life, or other scenes such as would have a demoralizing effect on young person; successful crime, such as bushranging, robberies, or other acts of lawlessness...

The New South Wales government claimed that the Theatres and Public Halls Act 1912 was meant to protect film audiences, particularly young audiences, from "injurious influence." This included the criminal activity of bushrangers. They were also against most bushranger films' depiction of the police as an antagonistic force. Anyone going against the act could be subject to a fine of up to £20.

The police were placed in charge of censoring films in accordance with the standards set by the 1912 amendment. They were to look over film summaries in order to determine their appropriateness, and could also demand a screening of a film if they thought it contained any "objectionable" material.

== Censorship of film imports and exports ==
In 1917, state censor boards were supplemented by a national Commonwealth Film Censorship Board. The national Censorship Board judged the content of imported films, primarily those from Britain and the USA. State censor boards could take additional action if they believed that the Commonwealth Film Censorship Board had acted too leniently.

In 1920, the Chief Secretary of Victoria attempted to prevent the development of a film about the Kelly Gang that he believed would spread a negative image of Victoria. The Australian government feared that attempts to ban the film in Australia would result in its international distribution. The government worried that the international release of any films that portrayed Australia negatively would damage the country's global image. Though the government could not intervene in the creation of a film, it could control its distribution. That year, the Minister of Customs was placed in charge of regulating the export of films from Australia to other parts of the world.

== Impact of the ban on Australian film ==
Before the bushranger ban, bushranging had been the most common topic for Australian films. After the ban, film production in Australia decreased as creators lost their most popular genre and the audiences it drew to the theatres. Unsurprisingly, the new censorship forces were met with discontent from the Australian film industry. H. M. Hawkins, the managing director of Spencer's Pictures, argued that censorship would limit the industry's ability to grow, since depictions of crime were essential to the creation of a successful drama. In December 1916, a week after a violent film about gambling was prevented from being screened, a group of Australian film exhibitors gathered to discuss the impact of censorship on their business. They expressed frustration with the fact that the police were in charge of film censors, claiming that the police department was most threatened by bushranger films' depictions of crime and as a result was hardest on crime in film over all other content. They also pointed out that films were being censored far more harshly than written material with the same content.

The primary threat the New South Wales government saw in bushranger films was their apparent glorification of crime. As a result, some bushranger films could get through the censors if the criminal activity they depicted was condemned within the film and law enforcement wasn't shown in a negative light. However, because of the stigma that had developed around the genre, few directors were willing to risk making bushranger films, especially if they had established reputations to uphold. In 1920, the director Raymond Longford avoided adapting Robbery Under Arms in order to preserve his status within the Australian film industry.

== Decline of the bushranger ban ==
The end of the bushranger ban was arguably indicated by the 1942 release of When the Kellys Rode in New South Wales. When the Kellys Rode, a bushranger film about the Kelly Gang, had been banned in 1934. It was the last film banned under the Theatres and Public Halls Act for bushranging content. Jack Baddeley, Chief Secretary of New South Wales, finally allowed it to screen in New South Wales in the midst of World War II, claiming that the crimes that the film depicted were nothing compared to "the unbridled horrors of war." After When the Kellys Rode, the Theatres and Public Halls Act was invoked again by Chief Secretary Baddeley to ban the violent British film Brighton Rock. Brighton Rock had been allowed into Australia by the Commonwealth Film Censorship Appeals Board, and the Chief Secretary would state no reason for the decision to ban the film in New South Wales.

By the time that bushranger ban was finally lifted in the 1940s, the popularity of and demand for the genre had already faded. Even after bushranging in film was legal, at least one attempt to produce a bushranger film was met with discontent from Australian citizens. In 1947, residents of Glenrowan, a town associated with the Kelly Gang, protested against Harry Southwell's plans to shoot a film about Ned Kelly in their town. Glenrowan's farmers sent a petition to Parliament to ban the film, claiming that bushranger films had given a negative reputation to the descendants of the Kelly Gang.

== Select bushranger films ==
=== Before the ban ===
- Bushranging in North Queensland (1904)
- The Story of the Kelly Gang (1906)
- Robbery Under Arms (McMahon version) (1907)
- Robbery Under Arms (Tait version) (1907)
- Thunderbolt (1910)
- Moonlite (1910)
- The Life and Adventures of John Vane, the Notorious Australian Bushranger (1910)
- A Tale of the Australian Bush (1911)
- Captain Midnight, the Bush King (1911)
- Captain Starlight, or Gentleman of the Road (1911)
- The Lady Outlaw (1911)
- Dan Morgan (1911)
- Ben Hall and his Gang (1911)
- Bushranger's Ransom, or A Ride for Life (1911)
- Frank Gardiner, the King of the Road (1911)

=== Affected by the ban ===
- Moondyne (1913)
- The Kelly Gang (1920)
- Robbery Under Arms (1920)
- The Shadow of Lightning Ridge (1920)
- The Gentleman Bushranger (1921)
- When the Kellys Were Out (1922)
- Trooper O'Brien (1928)
- When the Kellys Rode (1934)
- Stingaree (1934)
