= The Mark of the Lash =

- Newcastle Herald 4 October 1911
- Directed by: John Gavin
- Written by: Agnes Gavin
- Produced by: Stanley Crick; Herbert Finlay
- Starring: John Gavin
- Production company: Australian Photo-Play Company
- Distributed by: Australia-Photo Play Company
- Release date: July 1911
- Running time: 4,000 feet or 2,000 feet
- Country: Australia
- Language: Silent film

The Mark of the Lash is a 1911 Australian silent film. It is a convict-era melodrama made by the husband-and-wife team of John and Agnes Gavin.

== Plot ==
The movie broke into the following chapters:

1. Love's Young Dream.
2. An Insult. The Traitor.
3. The Secret Marriage. Arrest of Dennis Blake.
4. Transported for Life.
5. Botany Bay Settlement.
6. On the Triangle. The Recognition.
7. The Mark of the Lash.
8. The Confession. Kind-Hearted Warder.
9. A Sensational Escape.
10. A Cold Bath. The Police Baffled.
11. Black Sal's Strategy.
12. Rescue of the Governor's Daughter.
13. Acquitted.
14. A Good Friend. The Dismissal of Captain Morley.

== Cast ==
Townsville Bulletin 5 April 1912

- John Gavin

== Production ==
Gaving had made four films in association with Stanley Crick and Herbert Finlay: The Assigned Servant, Ben Hall, Frank Gardiner and Keane of Kalgoorlie. The success of his enabled Crick to set up the Australian Photoplay Company who made The Mark of the Lash.

Gavin wrote "I did not favour the idea particularly, as they were introducing two more producers, and I did not think the time was quite ripe for such expansion. As it was, we were all making good money, but the extra people coming in would make the overhead absorb all this; so I pulled out and received a cash price for a parcel of shares, sold out my interest in the four films I had made, and started out on my own as the John F. Gavin Productions."

He set his own company in July 1911.

The movie was announced as being completed and available for screening by July 1911, but does not appear to have been released until the following year.

== Release ==
During a screening in Toowoomba an Irish member of the audience took exception to a scene where a convict was being flogged and attacked the screen before being guided back to his seat.
