= A Melbourne Mystery =

- The Age 10 May 1913
- Directed by: John Gavin
- Produced by: John Gavin
- Starring: John Gavin
- Cinematography: A. Sculthorpe
- Release date: 12 May 1913
- Running time: 4,000 feet
- Country: Australia
- Language: Silent film

A Melbourne Mystery is a 1913 Australian silent film starring John Gavin. Another title is The Unseen Hand.

It is considered a lost film.

According to the Newcastle Morning Herald "it is full of thrilling adventure and exciting experience:at sea and in foreign parts, with all the elements of romance and mystery woven into the plot."

== Cast ==
- John Gavin
- Agnes Gavin
- Mrs Sculson

== Production ==
The film was shot in Melbourne. A. Sculthorpe, who worked on the movie, remembers the film as being "a little starved because of the promoters lack of finance" but said it "compared favourably with the Importations of the time." He also recalled shooting a sequence involving a brawl in Swanston Street which resulted in police trying to arrest the actors.

== Reception ==
According to Sculthorpe "it was a good picture but the exhibitors gave us little encouragement."

Gavin said "it opened at Hoyt’s, Bourke Street, and ran for a week to big business, after which we played the suburban shows."
