= The Murder of Captain Fryatt =

1917 film by John Gavin

- Poster for the film
- Directed by: John Gavin
- Written by: Agnes Gavin
- Produced by: John Gavin
- Starring: Harrington Reynolds; John Gavin
- Cinematography: Franklyn Barrett
- Production company: Australian Famous Feature Company
- Distributed by: John Gavin
- Release date: 26 February 1917
- Running time: 44 mins (four reels)
- Country: Australia
- Language: Silent film

Sunday Times 25 Feb 1917

The Murder of Captain Fryatt is a 1917 Australian silent film from John and Agnes Gavin about the execution of Captain Charles Fryatt during World War I.

It is an unofficial follow up to the Gavin's film about the execution of Edith Cavell, The Martyrdom of Nurse Cavell (1916), which had been a huge box office success.

It is considered a lost film.

== Plot ==
The Gavins claimed the plot "followed closely the facts contained in the official report of the British Admiralty" about the Fryatt incident, with a Belgian love story added.

The film begins after Fryatt, the commander of a merchant ship, has rammed a German submarine, and has returned to London a hero. German spies seek to track him down. Fryatt goes on another voyage, is captured by the Germans and executed.

== Cast ==
- Harrington Reynolds as Captain Charles Fryatt
- John Gavin as Von Kehlen
- Olive Proctor as Mrs. Fryatt
- Augustus Neville
- Charles Villiers
- Roland Watts-Phillips
- Mabel Fish as Baby
- Percy Walshe
- Clara Stevenson
- Elsie Prince

== Production ==
The film was a follow-up to Gavin's popular hit The Martyrdom of Nurse Cavell (1916), the success of which enabled Gavin to take out a lease at a studio in North Sydney. He announced plans to make four films continuously, of which this was to be the first.

Fryatt's murder was one of the three best known German atrocities of World War I, the others being the sinking of the RMS Lusitania and the execution of nurse Edith Cavell. Gavin sought official approval from the New South Wales Chief Secretary prior to making the film. This was given, provided the actual execution of Fryatt was not shown.

Production was very swift – Fryatt was killed on 27 July 1916 and filming took place in January 1917. It was ready for screening in February 1917. The script was reportedly based on British admiralty naval reports.

Agnes Gavin copyrighted her script on 17 February 1917.

Franklyn Barrett did the photography. In late January one report said "From what I have seen of the negative, Franklin Barrett will be congratulated on the excellence of his photography."

During filming a sequence in North Sydney where soldiers raid a haunt of German spies, some bystanders joined in and had to be restrained by the police and John Gavin from smashing the plate glass in front of the shop. Reportedly over five hundred people were involved in the production.

== Reception ==
Although the film's tone was similarly anti-German to Nurse Cavell it was not as successful at the box office. However in 1921 Agnes Gavin claimed the film was a "moneymaker".

The Newcastle Northern Times said the film "illustrates the high degree of. perfection attained in moving-picture production in Australia."
