= Three Years With Thunderbolt =

1910 non fiction book by William Monckton

- Author: William Monckton
- Language: English
- Subject: memoir
- Publisher: The States Publishing Co. of Sydney
- Publication date: 1910
- Publication place: Australia

Three Years with Thunderbolt is a 1910 non fiction Australian book by William Monckton of his experiences riding with the bushranger Captain Thunderbolt. It was adapted into a stage play and film.

== Background ==
Monckton's account was edited by Ambrose Pratt and was serialised in 1905, with the title Three Years With Thunderbolt, in the Melbourne The Argus newspaper.

In 1910 the narrative was compiled as a book, published by The States Publishing Co. of Sydney.

The book was adapted into the play Thunderbolt.

The play was turned into the 1910 film Thunderbolt.
