= Jack Gavin =

Australian film director

John F. ('Jack') Gavin
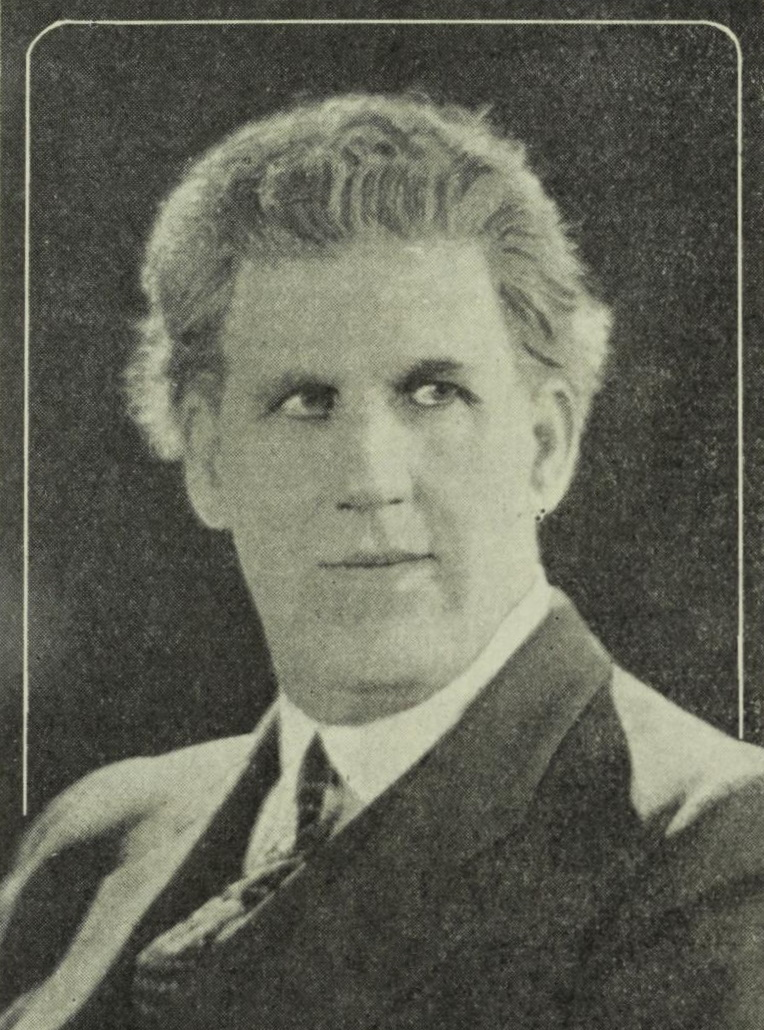
- Portrait of John F. Gavin, published in 1925.
- Born: John Francis Gavin; 9 February 1874; Sydney, Australia
- Died: 6 January 1938 (aged 63); Bronte, Sydney
- Occupations: film director and producer; actor
- Spouse: Agnes Adele Kurtz (née Wangenheim)
- Parent(s): Francis Gavin & Catherine (née O'Brien)

John F. Gavin (9 February 1874 – 6 January 1938) was a pioneer Australian film actor and director, one of the early filmmakers of the 1910s. He is best known for making films about bushrangers such as Captain Thunderbolt, Captain Moonlite, Ben Hall and Frank Gardiner. Known informally as 'Jack', Gavin worked in collaboration with his wife Agnes, who scripted many of his films.

Film historians Graham Shirley and Brian Adams have written; "although Gavin was prolific his later surviving work shows that his entrepreneurial talent outweighed any he might have had as director." Filmink called Gavin and his wife "good solid carny folk who fought the good fight."

Amongst several claims made later in life or soon after his death was one that he had made Australia's first animated short, an advertising film which featured a koala "lapping up a cough remedy".

== Biography ==
John F. Gavin was born in Sydney on 9 February 1874, the eldest child of Francis Gavin and Catherine (née O'Brien). Gavin later claimed he worked for a circus as a ten-year-old. He moved to the country and worked as a cattle drover, being involved in a record cattle drive from Camooweal in Queensland to Adelaide. "A man of fine physique and imposing presence" he served for a time in the Sydney Lancers as the captain of a squadron. He was interested in acting and received an offer to join the touring company of Bland Holt. He stayed with them for a number of seasons, then travelled to the USA where he worked with Barnum and Bailey's Circus, and Buffalo Bill's Wild West Show. He married Agnes in 1898.

Gavin returned to Australia and organised his own Wild West Show which was successful at the Melbourne Cyclorama, although he experienced a number of legal troubles. Gavin eventually had a company of 150 before moving into filmmaking. In 1908, he started managing theatres which he did for the next few years. He secured the site of the Bijou (later Princess) Theatre on George Street, opposite the railway station, for the movie pioneer J. F. W. Thiel.

=== Filmmaking debut ===
His debut feature was about Thunderbolt, produced by H. A. Forsyth, and its success launched his career. As one writer later put it:

With the aid of a gallant, if small, company of triers, including Mrs. Gavin as scenario writer and leading lady, and himself as leading juvenile, he turned out several films dealing with the convict and bushranging eras. There were no such things as studios then, and all scenes, exteriors and interiors, had to be shot in the open with Old Sol supplying the light. The results were considered quite satisfactory, and the pictures made money.

He followed this up with Moonlite and by February 1911 it was written that "more film has been used over Jack Gavin than over any other Australian biograph actor." He was described as "the beauteous bushranger".

A newspaper profile attributed the success of Gavin's bushranging films to two main factors: the quality of horsemanship in them, and the fact they were normally shot on the real locations where the events occurred.

Another writer stated in 1911 that "The pictures already turned out by Mr Gavin demonstrates that in bio graphic art Australian producers are in no way behind their European and American brothers. Clearness in detail and execution, with the cleverly-constructed stories by Agnes Gavin enable Mr Gavin to offer attractive films."

A newspaper wrote a ballad about Gavin:

He played as Ben Hall, Moonlight too.

He's also played with Holt. And on the screen he's to be seen. Dressed up as Thunderbolt. Whilst acting he has cried,'Bail up'. And put the tops to rout; In fact, he knows more bail up Than some chaps are bailed out. He poses as a cut-throat fierce, With pistols and a frown; But looks a harmless sort of cuss

When strutting round the town.

Gavin's films were also often accompanied by popular lecturer Charles Woods.

His first two movies were made for H.A. Forsyth at Southern Cross Motion Pictures but he and Forsyth had a falling out and Gavin went his separate way, publicly announcing the fact in January 1911.

In July 1911 he set up his own company, the Gavin Photo Play Company, based out of Waverley.

He was involved in the formation of the Australian Photo-Play Company but then established his own production company in October 1911. Gavin later said

I did not favour the idea [for the APP] particularly, as they were introducing two more producers, and I did not think the time was quite ripe for such expansion. As it was, we were all making good money, but the extra people coming in would make the overhead absorb all this; so I pulled out and received a cash price for a parcel of shares, sold out my interest in the four films I had made, and started out on my own as the John F. Gavin Productions.

When bushranging films were banned in 1912 he turned to dramatising other true characters, such as Edith Cavell and Charles Fryatt.

In 1912 Gavin was arrested for owing money to a business associate, though he was later released.

In January 1917 he took out a lease on a studio at North Sydney and announced plans for make four feature films over a year, starting with The Murder of Captain Fryatt. He also started up a film school and spoke of offers from America.

Gavin was also credited as directing the first Australian advertising short film, a koala using a cough syrup.

=== Move to the US ===
Making movies in Australia was becoming increasingly difficult for him so Gavin moved to Hollywood, where he lived for eight years in all, appearing in what he claimed were over 300 films and becoming a friend of Lon Chaney Rudolph Valentino and Stan Laurel.

He reportedly also worked with Harold Lloyd and Snub Pollard.

Gavin claimed he helped popularise the drinking of tea in Hollywood.

=== Return to Australia ===
He returned to Australia in February 1922 to make several outback films, including a serial based on Ned Kelly, and set up a company in Brisbane, but faced censorship problems and could not raise the capital.

He went back to Hollywood in May 1923, then returned to Australia in 1925.

He gave evidence at the 1928 Royal Commission on the Moving Picture Industry in Australia arguing in favour of a quota for Australian films.

== Personality ==
He was described as "a big man with a generous and naive personality... more enthusiasm and stubborn persistence than talent." Towards the end of his life he lived in a flat in Neutral bay and suffered from rheumatism.

He died in 1938 survived by Agnes and their daughters. A child had predeceased him in 1917.

== Filmography ==
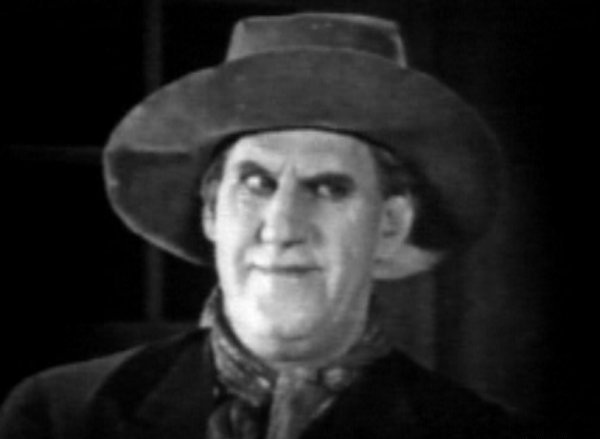
Jack Gavin as 'Nelse Tyler' in The White Sheep (1924).

- Thunderbolt (1910)
- Moonlite (1910) (a. k. a. Captain Moonlite)
- Ben Hall and his Gang (1911)
- Frank Gardiner, the King of the Road (1911)
- Keane of Kalgoorlie (1911)
- The Assigned Servant (1911)
- The Mark of the Lash (1911)
- The Drover's Sweetheart (1911)
- Assigned to his Wife (1911)
- A Melbourne Mystery (1913)
- The Martyrdom of Nurse Cavell (1916)
- An Interrupted Divorce (1916)
- Cast Up By the Sea (1916)
- Charlie at the Sydney Show (1916)
- The Murder of Captain Fryatt (1917)
- His Convict Bride (1918) (a. k. a. For the Term of her Natural Life)
- The Prisoner of the Pines (1919) – actor only
- The Fighting Tylers – actor only
- The White Sheep (1924) – actor only
- All Wet (1924) – actor only
- Tell It to a Policeman (1925) – actor only
- Official Officers (1925) – actor only
- Sherlock Sleuth (1925) – actor only
- Yes, Yes, Nanette (1925) – actor only
- Innocent Husbands (1925) – actor only
- No Father to Guide Him (1925) – actor only
- The Outlaw's Daughter (1925) – actor only
- Breakin' Loose (1925) – actor only
- Good Cheer (1926) – actor only
- The Old War-Horse (1926) – actor only
- For Heaven's Sake! (1927) – actor only, with Harold Lloyd
- The Fluttering Hearts (1927) – actor only
- The Adorable Outcast (1928) – actor only
- Trooper O'Brien (1928)

=== Unmade films ===
- The Lubra's Revenge – announced to follow Drover's Sweetheart in 1911
- The White Hope – announced November 1911 – a boxing story where Gavin would play a character who fights an aboriginal (according to a contemporary article in the film "the Australian aboriginal will be shown in quite a new light, and though we are not at liberty to disclose the plot just yet, we can safely say that it will outrival the well known Red Indian dramas.")
- story of Russian life in World War I
- The Birth of Australia (1916) – a look at the history of Australia from the landing of Captain Cook at Botany Bay onwards – Gavin blamed the delay of this on war taxes and expressed interest in making the film in California
- The Song That Reached My Heart (1916) starring Vera Amee
- The Black Snake – a 15-part serial set in the Australian bush (1917)
- film starring Arthur Shirley with location shooting in Hawaii
- signed Nellie Stewart to a five-picture contract
- The Kelly Gang (announced 1922)
- biopic of Boy Charlton (circa 1923)
- a 1922 film with aboriginals in it

== Theatre ==
- Professor Fenton's Circus and Buck Jumping Show (1907)
- Deadwood Dick by Capt Jack Gavin's Wild West Dramatic Company (1907)
