= The White Sheep =

1924 film

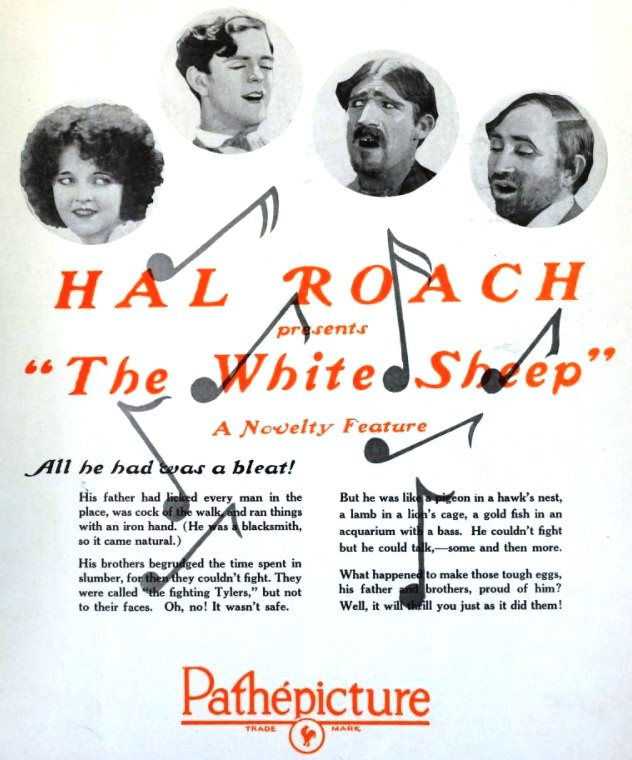
- Trade advertisement
- Directed by: Hal Roach
- Written by: Hal Roach
- Produced by: Hal Roach
- Starring: Glenn Tryon; Blanche Mehaffey; Jack Gavin
- Cinematography: Floyd Jackman; George Stevens
- Production company: Hal Roach Studios
- Distributed by: Pathé Exchange
- Release date: December 14, 1924
- Running time: 60 minutes
- Country: United States
- Language: Silent (English intertitles)

The White Sheep is a 1924 American silent comedy film directed by Hal Roach and starring Glenn Tryon, Blanche Mehaffey, and Jack Gavin.

== Plot ==
As described in a review in a film magazine, “Fighting” Nelse Tyler (Gavin), with his two roughneck sons Milt (Kortman) and Mose (Willis), rule the town of Tyler with an iron hand and are always ready to fight each other or outsiders. There is another son, Tobias (Tryon), whom his father considers a “white sheep” who was a sentimental chap and not a fighter, much to the disgust of the others. Patience Matthews (Mehaffey) and her father, Judge Matthews (Lynton), come to the town and all the Tylers try to court her, but Tobias is the favorite. Tom Calvert (Clayton), a loan sharp, seeks to down Nelse Tyler and failing, cooks up a story that Nelse has murdered Newt Randall (Gilbert). Nelse is tried and, to save him, Tobias drags the court house across the state line, but the ruse fails as the frightened horses drag it back. Nelse is convicted and about to be hung when Tobias learns Newt is still alive. He goes after him, subdues him, and brings him back in time to save his father. Nelse declares Tobias is a real fighting Tyler and leaves him with Patience while he prepares to lick Tom and Newt.

== Cast ==
- Glenn Tryon as Tobias Tyler
- Blanche Mehaffey as Patience Matthews
- Jack Gavin as Nelse Tyler
- Bob Kortman as Milt Tyler
- Leo Willis as Mose Tyler
- Chris Lynton as Judge Matthews
- J.J. Clayton as Tom Calvert
- Dick Gilbert as Newt Randall
- Richard Daniels as Al Morton

== Preservation ==
A copy of The White Sheep is held by a private collector and it has been released on DVD.

== Bibliography ==
- Munden, Kenneth White. The American Film Institute Catalog of Motion Pictures Produced in the United States, Part 1. University of California Press, 1997.
