= Keane of Kalgoorlie =

1911 silent film

Keane of Kalgoorlie, or a Story of the Sydney Cup
- Newcastle Herald 29 August 1911
- Directed by: John Gavin
- Written by: Agnes Gavin
- Based on: play by Edward William O'Sullivan; Arthur Wright from the novel by Arthur Wright
- Produced by: Herbert Finlay; Stanley Crick
- Starring: John Gavin; Agnes Gavin
- Cinematography: Herbert Finlay
- Production companies: Crick and Finlay
- Distributed by: Gaumont
- Release date: July 19, 1911
- Running time: 4,000 feet or 3,000 feet
- Country: Australia
- Language: Silent film

Keane of Kalgoorlie, or a Story of the Sydney Cup is a 1911 Australian silent film set in the racing and gambling circles of Sydney, based on a popular play by Edward William O'Sullivan and Arthur Wright, adapted from the novel by Wright.

It was made by the husband and wife team of John and Agnes Gavin and is considered a lost film.

== Synopsis ==
Sydney clerk Frank Keane is in love with Tess Moreton, who is desired by Gregory Harris. Keane farewells Tess at Circular Quay in order to go west to seek his fortune. Harris arranges with Harold Rose to send a telegram to Tess saying that Keane has married a Kalgoorlie barmaid. Tess believes this and marries Harris.

Ten years later, Keane and Tess meet again. Keane has become rich and wants to enter his horse in the Sydney Cup. He meets Harold Rose, who confesses the truth about falsifying the telegram, then shoots himself. Harris robs Rose's dead body and is spotted by a dosser, who blackmails him.

Tess overhears Harris and the blackmailer discussing a plan to abduct Keane's horse and prevent it from winning the race. With Tess' help, Keane ensures his horse wins the race. However, Harris then accuses him of the murder of Rose. However at a trial, a stolen watch proves his innocence, and Harris is arrested while Keane is freed. Harris kills himself and Keane and Tess get married.

== Cast ==
- John Gavin as Frank Keane
- Agnes Gavin as Tess Murton
- Alf Scarlett
- Charles Woods as Dave Dyeball
- Mr. Mainsbridge, wife and daughter
- Charlie Lay
- John (“Fatty”) Harris
- Charles Wade

== Original novel ==
The book was published in 1907 and was turned into a play the following year. See Keane of Kalgoorlie (novel)

== Film production ==
Wright later said he suggested the story might make an ideal film to John Gavin, who specialised in making films about bushrangers, "believing that a racing film would be welcomed as a change... It would be a shame to mention the price offered [for rights to the play] and accepted, but as I thought the picture would enhance the sale of the book, as the drama had done, I had no kick comings." Wright said he was paid on an instalment plan.

On 12 April 1911 it was announced the book "has been adapted for picture purposes" and "is being acted by Mr. J. F. Gavin — who has secured the rights to the picture drama— and his Australian company, headed by Agnes Gavin. Messrs. Crick and Finlay, cinematoraphers... are to manufacture the film."

There are sequences involving a boxing match and game of two-up, and the climax has Keane winning the Sydney Cup. During shooting racing authorities would not allow Randwick Racecourse to be used, so footage of a race in Western Australia, the Perth Cup, was used instead.

Wright claimed "Mob scenes did not cost a great deal" with extras for the two up school obtained by scouring by ways "and a crowd secured willing to act for the fun of the thing."The two up scene was shot on Castlereagh St near Market St with comic Dick Davis handling the extras.

In 1927 Wright wrote "well known actors of the rank and file of those days filled the minor characters. Of those seen in the “still” of the doss-house scene at least two are long since dead."

Authorities also refused permission to film at Darlinghurst Gaol, location for an important scene where the hero is released from prison. In order to get the shot, Gavin snuck into the prison along with tradesmen, then was filmed by his crew when exiting. Gavin also "stole" a shot involving Keane greeting a real-life well known barrister, "Charlie" Wade, without the barrister's knowledge.

== Reception ==
According to Arthur Wright, the film was released to "big business":

Wherever it was shown, box-office returns were a record for the times (prices 6d. and 3d. mostly). It packed the big tent show run, by the Mclntyres at North Sydney, where it was extensively advertised as 'A great Australian sporting story by Nat Gould.' This, of course, in my modesty, I objected to, and dodgers were sent out with a correction, and the lecturer, Mr. Woods, who played the part of Dave Dyeball, the Domain Dosser, in the picture, apologised for the mistake; and made a eulogistic reference to the 'young Australian author' who was really responsible. Yes, someone made money out of 'K of K', and there should be money to be made again under the altered conditions with a talkie, with the racecourse as a background. The author gained but little from his offspring, except experience and a measure of amusement from participation in what was a new diversion.

"The film made money for someone" he also wrote. " It was shown for months throughout the State."
