= C. Post Mason =

American singer

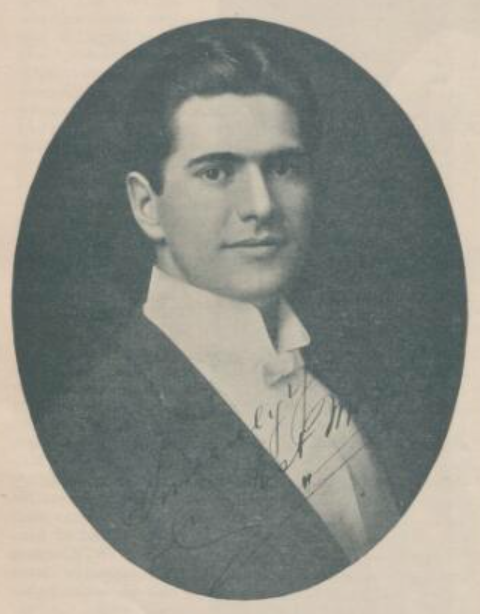
C. Post Mason in Australia in 1906

C. Post Mason (died December 4, 1918), Charles Post Mason, real name Charles Post Doutney, was an American director, singer and manager. He was born in Vermont and then became a vaudeville singer. He moved to England and then in 1904 emigrated to Australia.

In Australia he sang at the Tivoli and worked for the J.D. Williams Amusement Company, managing events such as bike races. He also worked for Hugh McIntosh, and Australasian Films and directed stage shows and managed theatres.

He directed The Martyrdom of Nurse Cavell which was a tremendous success. He took the film to North America to promote, accompanied by his wife.

He died in 1918 in New York City during the flu pandemic, aged 40. He was survived by his wife, Queensland girl Rose Moran, whom he had married in 1906, and their four children.

His son Charles Doutney (1908–1957), became a noted artist after he took up painting to help him recuperate from a rare blood disease.
