= Cast Up by the Sea =

1916 film

- Directed by: John Gavin
- Starring: John Gavin
- Release date: 1916
- Country: Australia
- Language: Silent film (Intertitles in English)

Cast Up by the Sea is a 1916 Australian film directed by John Gavin.
