= Berith Park, Wahroonga =

Berith Park
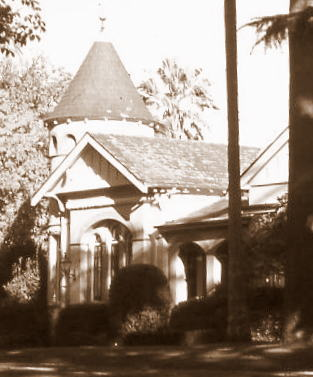
- An undated photo of the house

- Location within Sydney

General information
- Status: Completed
- Type: House
- Architectural style: Federation Queen Anne
- Location: 19 Billyard Avenue, Wahroonga, Upper North Shore, Sydney, New South Wales, Australia
- Coordinates: 33°43′07″S 151°07′24″E
- Completed: c. 1909
- Client: Alfred Smith
- Owner: Karthika Gunalingam

Dimensions
- Other dimensions: Tennis court; Swimming pool; Golf range and gym

Technical details
- Floor count: 1
- Floor area: 743 m^{2} (8,000 sq ft)
- Grounds: 7,583 m^{2} (2 acres)

Design and construction
- Architect: Francis Ernest Stowe
- Other designers: Annie Wilkes (garden)

New South Wales Heritage Database (Local Government Register)
- Official name: Berith Park
- Type: Ku-ring-gai Council local heritage (built)
- Designated: 4 November 1989
- Type: House
- Category: Residential buildings (private)

Berith Park is an historic house located in Wahroonga, an upper north shore suburb of Sydney, New South Wales, Australia. Completed in the Federation Queen Anne style, the house was listed on the Ku-ring-gai Council local government heritage register in 2015 and is in a heritage conservation area.

== History ==
Berith Park was designed by Francis Ernest Stowe for Alfred Smith, who came from Queensland. Smith acquired the land in 1897 and the house was finished around 1909. By 1914 the house was in the hands of Sir Arthur Rickard, the founder of the Dr Barnardos charity for children. Rickard made substantial changes to the house, putting in tennis courts, a swimming pool, a ballroom, an ornamental lake, cricket oval and gardens. The house was later bought by Alderman Stanley Crick, the Lord Mayor of Sydney and a founder of Fox Studios. Berith Park was used extensively as a location in a number of films. Crick later started selling off parts of the property. The Catholic Church bought the house in 1955 for use as a home for the Dominican Fathers and then Dominican Sisters. It was sold again in 1979 and extensive changes were made. In 2004 more subdivisions were made and an acre of the land was sold off.

Vivian and Wendy King purchased the house in 1990 for $5 million from retired bookmaker Bruce McHugh. The Kings sold the house in 2002 for $5.59 million. In December 2016 the house was sold by Warwick and Karen White for an estimated $20 million. It is now believed that the house is worth up to $40 million due to its large land area, and Victorian Architecture. It is a very precious house that is over 100 years of age.

== Description ==
Berith Park is a double-story house with an area of over 743 square metres (8,000 sq ft). It is situated on 7,583 m^{2} (2 acres) of land, with tennis courts and a swimming pool added by owners in the early 20th century as well as another 2 story summer house on the 2 acre property. The property also hosts the last piece of the endangered Blue Gum Forest, adding to its luscious green lawns and sprawling gardens. The main house has over 7 bathrooms and 5 bedrooms, it also has an additional other 8 rooms including a kitchen, library, gym, lounge room, laundry room, study, dining room and a ballroom with 10m high ceilings. The summer house than has an additional 3 bathrooms, 2 bedrooms, a kitchen, lounge room, a study and a Billiards room bringing the grand total to 7 bedrooms, 10 bathrooms and 12 other rooms. The grounds also contain a championship sized tennis court, a pool, a golfing range, 3 ponds, 2 fountains as well as 4 large lawns and a forest area. It is currently the most expensive house ever sold in the North Shore Region due to its acres of land as well as the Victorian Styled mansion and one of the largest as well.
