= Charlie at the Sydney Show =

- Brisbane Courier 29 July 1916
- Directed by: John Gavin
- Written by: Agnes Gavin
- Starring: Ern Vockler; Arthur Tauchert
- Cinematography: Alf Moulton
- Release date: 20 May 1916
- Running time: 25 minutes
- Country: Australia
- Language: Silent film

Charlie at the Sydney Show is a 1916 Australian short film starring Charlie Chaplin impersonator Ern Vockler directed by John Gavin.

Unlike many Australian films from the silent era, a copy of this survives almost in its entirety.

== Plot ==
A series of adventures happen to "Charlie" as he visits the Sydney Royal Easter Show: he chases a couple of larrikins who have picked the pocket of a man visiting the show, encounters various side-show acts, fights a boxing lady, meets a confidence man, and chases girls. The movie ends with a chance and Charlie driving off with a couple in a motor car.

== Cast ==
- Ern Vockler

== Production ==
The film was announced in May 1916. Vocker was a Chaplin impersonator who had been doing a "Chaoplin stunt" in Sydney for the past ten months.

The movie was shot at the Sydney show. It contains the first film appearance of Arthur Tauchert, who was almost killed in an accident during filming.

== Reception ==
Sun 14 May 1916

The critic from Punch praised the film saying:

Mr. Gavin had unearthed a comedian of undoubted talent, who, with only slightly more experience in "Movie" acting, will soon eclipse the majority of the efforts, of comedians playing in imported films, and even aspire to be the equal of the great Charlie Chaplin himself. Mr. Gavin is to be congratulated on giving the public a decided novelty in films, and also on the extraordinarily heavy bookings he had already received for the exhibition of the picture in the N.S.W. shows. The scenario... contains many humorous situations... whilst the photography... is quite equal to anything yet screened in Sydney.
