= The Martyrdom of Nurse Cavell =

- Still from the film
- Directed by: John Gavin; C. Post Mason
- Written by: Agnes Gavin
- Produced by: John Gavin
- Starring: Vera Pearce
- Cinematography: Lacey Percival
- Production company: Australian Famous Feature Company
- Release date: January 31, 1916
- Running time: 4,000 feet
- Country: Australia
- Language: Silent film
- Budget: £450 or £1,400 or £300,
- Box office: £25,000 (est.)

The Martyrdom of Nurse Cavell is a 1916 Australian silent film starring John Gavin about the execution of nurse Edith Cavell during World War I.

Although one of the most popular Australian silent movies ever made, it is considered a lost film.

== Synopsis ==
The story is told in four parts. The film starts at the English home of Edith Cavell before the war, then jumps forward six years to a Belgium hospital, where Cavell is working. The war is about to start and Dr Schultz suggests Nurse Cavell return home but she refuses, saying her place is with the sick. She gets an invitation to the wedding of two friends, Lt Renard and Yvonne Loudet. Herr Cries is also invited; he pretends to be a medical student but is in fact a foreign spy and is a rejected suitor of Yvonne. He forces himself on her, but Lt Renard knocks him out and Cries departs, swearing vengeance. The wedding ends when everyone gets news that war has been declared and Renard goes to military headquarters.

Four months later Brussels has been occupied by the Germans and Cavell is tending wounded British, German and Belgium soldiers alike. Lt Renard has been captured and imprisoned by the Germans. He makes an escape with the help of friends and visits his wife and parents. Yvonne asks Nurse Cavell to help them escape the country. She advises her to send her husband to the Café Française and give the password "Liberty" to Monsieur Fouchard, the proprietor, in exchange for false passports.

Renard succeeds but Herr Cries and Captain Hoffberg follow him home. Hoffberg murders Renard's father, causing the mother to die of shock. He then tries to rape Yvonne but Renard intervenes. A struggle ensues, with Yvonne saving her husband's life and the two of them escaping.

Cries and Hoffberg report the escape to Baron von Bissell, Military Governor of Brussels, and report their suspicions about Nurse Cavell. Searching the hospital, Cries finds a letter of gratitude from England incriminating Nurse Cavell for assisting another prisoner of war to escape. She is captured by the Germans and refused legal advice, being secretly tried and sentenced to death.

The American Ambassador pleads for her life, and the Reverend Gerard demands the right to see her and administer communion. The German officer Von Bissell grants a permit. She is sentenced and shot at 2am, her last words being: "Tell my friends I give my life willingly for my country. I have no fear or shrinking. I have seen death so often, it is not fearful or strange to me."

== Cast ==
- Vera Pearce as Edith Cavell
- John Gavin as Captain von Hoffberg, a German cavalry officer
- C. Post Mason as Georges Renard, a Belgian officer
- Harrington Reynolds as Reverend Thomas Gerard
- Percy Walshe as Baron Von Bissell, the German military Governor at Brussels
- Charles Villiers as Herr Cries, a German spy
- George Portus as Dr Schultz
- Roland Stavey as American Ambassador
- James Martin as Monsieur Renard
- Robert Floyd as Monsieur Fouchard of the Cafe Française
- George Farrell as disabled soldier
- Ethel Bashford as Yvonne Loudet, Lt Reynard's sweetheart
- Clare Stephenson as Madame Renard
- Nellie Power as Nurse Marcheau

== Production ==
The Sun 30 Jan 1916

John Gavin got the idea to make the film after reading a newspaper story about Cavell's death. Agnes Gavin wrote the script overnight and finance was obtained from two leading distributors, J. D. Williams and the partnership of Stanley Crick and Jones.

Agnes Gavin copyrighted her script on 7 January 1916.

Filming took three weeks in and around Sydney, with locations at Watsons Bay and interiors at Darlinghurst Gaol (standing in for German Headquarters) and the Rushcutters Bay Studio, finishing in early January 1916. It was the first film made on this topic in the world.

The movie was co-directed with an American, C. Post Mason, who had been working for Australasian Films and also appeared in the movie as the romantic lead. Eleven stone Mason had a fight scene with 18 stone Gavin, which Mason's character was required to win; in order to make this believable, the script was rewritten to have Ethel Bashford's character come in and smash Gavin over the head with a vase.

Vera Pearce was appearing in the Tivoli Follies at the time. Harrington Reynolds had just appeared on stage in The Rosary. The Motion Picture News wrote during production that "I am off the opinion that it will be one of the usual war dramas. If so, it seems a pity to waste such talent as that possessed by Miss Pearce and Harrington Reynolds."

Australian Prime Minister William Hughes sent a letter to Mason prior to the film's release, stating that:

I shall certainly be pleased to see the Photo-play dealing with the Martyrdom and execution of Nurse Cavell, which you propose to produce shortly; but I'm very much afraid that I shall not be able to do so, seeing that in the course of a few days I shall be leaving Australian for London and will be absent for some little time. I wish the venture success, and hope it may be the medium of impressing on people the dreadful inhumanity of our enemy."

== Reception ==
The film was given a preview in front of several notables in January 1916, including the Governor General and acting Prime Minister.

=== Critical ===
Reviews were generally good.

The Bulletin called it " in every way a creditable production. The story is simply and convincingly told."

The Daily Telegraph said "The strong part of the film is that which depicts the shooting of Nurse Cavell... Miss Pearce plays the part throughout with marked intelligence, and to her efforts the success of the film is largely due." The critic wondered, "It is open to question, however, whether the last rites of the church were such as to make it necessary for the nurse before her execution to kiss a cross to which is attached the rosary beads. This is only a matter of detail, however, which does not otherwise affect the excellence of the film."

Triad magazine wrote:

The houses are obviously Australian, and not Belgian—and many of the players are obviously Australian too. Miss Vera Pearce, who plays the nurse with much womanly grace and dignity, is surprisingly good if a trifle too statuesque. Mr. George Portus, who only appears for a minute or so, makes a sufficiently convincing doctor...In the story as faked there are many improbabilities... There is too much deliberate catering to blood-blind British prejudice. Why shouldn't we admit the truth about Nurse Cavell?... this is not the sort of picture that should be made in Australia. Being made here, it was obviously made to catch pennies. Australian pictures should be Australian in the true sense.

=== Box office ===
Gavin recalled, "We opened for a week at the Lyric where business was so big that they had it on at the Lyceum for the flowing week, switching with the Olympic in Oxford Street."

By April 1917 it had made an estimated £10,000.

Gavin said the film made over £20,000. The movie ran in Queensland for twelve months. He told the 1927 Royal Commission it made £25,000 in Australia, the US, Canada and England.

=== Foreign Release ===
Mason went to the US and Canada to promote the film. He wrote back saying:

Even if this country was to go to war with Germany, the Cavell picture would not go. The German population here is enormous, and they are in the picture business to a great extent. They do not want the horrors of war depicted. The war pictures have all been a failure... They don't want war here under any circumstances. The majority of the opinions favour the Allies, and bazaars are held all over the country to raise funds for the Allies' Bed Cross; while you seldom here of anything, being done for the Germans. But you cannot talk with anyone; the subject is left alone.

However Gavin says the film "was as big a success there as it was in Australia." It also achieved release in South Africa, India and the UK.

In May 1917 it was reported the film was "a big success" in South Africa.

Post was American. He stayed in New York and died during the 1918 flu pandemic on 12 December 1918.

=== Re-release ===
The film was reissued in Australia in 1928 following the banning of a British movie on the topic, Dawn.
