= All Wet (1924 film) =

1924 film

- Directed by: Leo McCarey
- Produced by: Hal Roach
- Starring: Charley Chase
- Cinematography: Len Powers
- Production company: Hal Roach Studios
- Distributed by: Pathé Exchange
- Release date: November 23, 1924
- Running time: 10 minutes
- Country: United States
- Languages: Silent film English intertitles

All Wet is a 1924 American film starring Charley Chase and featuring William Gillespie, 'Tonnage' Martin Wolfkeil and Jack Gavin. It also featured an uncredited appearance of the future star Janet Gaynor in one of her very first roles.

== Plot ==
Jimmie Jump is a boarder who receives an urgent telegram telling him to pick up a large shipment from the train station at exactly 2:30 p.m. the following Wednesday. On the appointed day, Jimmie has great difficulty getting to the station in his Ford Model T: enroute, the vehicle becomes stuck in mud, is sunk in a lake, then torn apart by a tow truck. To add insult to injury, Jimmie is cited for illegal parking. Ironically, he discovers that his errand was performed on the wrong day.

== Cast ==
- Charley Chase as Jimmie Jump
- William Gillespie as the other driver
- 'Tonnage' Martin Wolfkeil as the garage mechanic
- Jack Gavin as the piano mover
- Gale Henry (uncredited)
- Janet Gaynor (uncredited)
- Martha Sleeper (uncredited)
- Olive Borden (uncredited)

== Production ==
All Wet was shot over the course of seven days at Hollenbeck Park, near downtown Los Angeles.

== Reception ==
In a contemporary review of the film, Thomas C. Kennedy wrote, "When it comes to comedy of the clean-cut, theatrically effective sort, there is no surer hand in the realm of short subject specialists than Charles Parrott."

== Legacy ==
The main gag of the car stuck in the watery ditch was remade by Chase in the 1933 talkie short Fallen Arches. In his book, Hooked on Hollywood: Discoveries from a Lifetime of Film Fandom, critic Leonard Maltin wrote that this "hilarious" scene triumphed over the remake partly because "the reality of a talking world couldn't accommodate bizarre or surreal sight gags".

== See also ==
- List of American films of 1924

== Sources ==
- Hooper, Gary and Poague, Leland. 1980. Leo McCarey Filmography, in The Hollywood Professionals: Wilder and McCarey, Volume 7. The Tanvity Press, A. S. Barnes and Company, Inc, San Diego, California. pp. 295–314 ISBN 0-498-02181-5
- Poague, Leland. 1980. The Hollywood Professionals: Wilder and McCarey, Volume 7. The Tanvity Press, A. S. Barnes and Company, Inc, San Diego, California. ISBN 0498-02181-5
