= An Interrupted Divorce =

- Directed by: John Gavin
- Written by: Agnes Gavin
- Starring: Fred Bluett; Verma Remee
- Release date: 6 August 1916
- Country: Australia
- Language: Silent film

An Interrupted Divorce is a 1916 Australian short comedy film directed by John Gavin starring popular vaudeville comedian Fred Bluett.

It was in three parts.

It was originally known as The Revue Girls.

Its release was delayed due to the lack of film stock in the country.

A contemporary critic said that "Miss Gwen Lewis, the clever monologuist of the Royal Strollers, has been entrusted with the leading role, and has proved her versatility by giving an excellent portrayal of the character entrusted to her. Everything points to Miss Lewis making as big a success on the screen as on the speaking stage." The movie screened as a supporting item to the main feature.

It is considered a lost film.

== Cast ==
- Fred Bluett
- Vera Remee
- The Revue Girls including Gwen Lewis
- Palladium Ballet

== Reception ==
The Moving Picture World said it was "very amusing".

The Lone Hand said Bluett "seemed to have mislaid his jolly personality. Vera Remee, as the wife, looked at odd moments astonishingly like Pauline Fredrick, but she appeared to be too busy with the toothache to remember her prettiness. The scenario... contains the germs of good comedy, but the actors got out of the producer’s control just at the wrong moments and not infrequently the supers resembled pupils of photoplay acting in the embryo stage of direction. The indoor sets were better on the whole than the exteriors, but the photoplay was a long way from good. "
