= Thunderbolt (play) =

1905 play by A. Joseph and Ambrose Pratt

- Original language: English
- Written by: A. Joseph; Ambrose Pratt
- Based on: Three Years with Thunderbolt by William Monckton
- Characters: Captain Thunderbolt

Premiere
- Date: 14 October 1905
- Place: Theatre Royal, Sydney

Thunderbolt is a 1905 Australian play about the bushranger Captain Thunderbolt, based on the book Three Years with Thunderbolt by William Monckton.

Monckton's narrative was serialised in The Argus newspaper. It was popular and was adapted by Ambrose Pratt and A. Joseph for the stage in 1905.

Producer William Anderson said "This production is absolutely Australian. It has been written by Australian playwrights. The characters are Australian notabilities. The scenery has been painted by Australian painters. It will be acted by Australian artists, and played before Australian audiences. Advance Australia!"

== Reception ==
The Bulletin said "the house most obviously liked it. No howling London melodrama of the last two Anderson seasons has been better received. As a piece of entertainment it answered its purpose. The Andersonian audience wants plenty of action, and “Thunderbolt” supplies that... You get an evening of Thunderbolt with an interesting and reasonably sober plot thrown in, and a menagerie of wallabies, kookaburras, mail coaches, and cockatoos to add more local color to Reg Robins’ New England (N.S.W.) scenery."

The Evening News said "Thunderbolt was imaginatively drawn, his opinions and his method of moralising being struck in too intellectual a key. "

The Sydney Morning Herald said "In the plot, Thunderbolt...is depicted as an outlaw who robs the rich but spares the poor, and who, indeed, generously assists the latter from funds nefariously acquired from other people. He has a high opinion of his own virtue, and mentions the fact in verbose language, couched in terms refined enough to make the wallabies in his vicinity sit up with admiration, and subdue the desire of the kookaburras to laugh as they listen to his glowing rhetoric."

The Age called it "a good, honest and thoroughly workmanlike melodrama on more or less conventional lines, in which a sentimental interest is handled judiciously and the sensational element plays a smaller part than in many of Mr. Anderson's imported pieces. There are several admirably planned situations and tableaus, a story that runs evenly and plausibly, a really humorous comic relief, and above all things an application of local" color to the scenes and a local idiom to the dialogue which make a direct and immediate appeal to an Australian audience."

== Structure ==
The play was structured as follows:

- Act. 1: Scene 1 – Kurrajong Station. Thunderbolt Takes a Hand. The Arrival of the Police.
- Act. 2: Scene 1 – M'Guire's Pub; Scene 2. – Bar Parlour; Scene 3. – Verandah of M'Guire's Pub (By Night).
- Act. 3: Scene 1. – M'Guire's Half-way House; Scene 2. – Bedroom in M'Guire's Hotel; Scene 3. – In the Bush; Scene 4. – Poison Gap – The Coach Stuck Up – The Chase – Thunderbolt's Daring Leap for Life.
- Act. 4: Scene 1. – Squatter Mason's Drawing-room; Scene 2. – The Bedchamber; Scene 3. – Barroom of M'Guire's Half-way House; Scene 4. – In the Bush; Scene 5. – Squatter Mason's Station — Thunderbolt's Sacrifice; Scene 6. – In the Bush; Scene 7. – The River Bank, Kurrajong – Farewell to the Outlaw.

The play was produced by William Anderson and starred Eugenie Duggan.

== 1905 Cast ==
Cast of the original production:

- Laurence Dunbar as Fred Ward (alias Capt. Thunderbolt)
- Stiling Whyte as Alexander Mason
- George Cross as Jack Mason
- Bert Bailey as the Hon. Algernon Chetwood
- Edmund Duggan as Michael McGuIre
- Edwin Campbell as Trooper Denis O'Malley
- Percy Goodwin as Trooper Smith
- Frank Rossmore as Inspector Hare
- IH Nunn as Patrick O'Sullivan
- WIllie McGuire as Temple Harrison
- Harold Forbes as Walter Dalgleish
- Peter Smith as J. L. Lawrence
- Bully Evans as Max Clifto
- Harvey Wilton as Bully Evans
- Roy Willmot as Old Ned
- Eugenie Duggan as Maude Maren

== 1910 cast ==
A cast list from a 1910 production was:

- George Cross as Fred Ward (alias Captain Thunderbolt)
- Alf Scarlett as Mr. Alexander Mason (Owner of Kurrajong Station)
- Max Clifton as Jack Mason (his son)
- Rutland Beckett as Geoffrey Marrow, J. P. (bank manager)
- Bert Bailey as The Hon. Algernon Chetwynd (Jackeroo)
- J.H. Nunn as Michael M'Guire
- Edmund Duggan as Trooper Denis O'Malley (mounted police)
- Harry Reacy as Trooper Smith (mounted police)
- Frank Rossmore as Inspector Hare (police inspector)
- Carleton Stuart as Patrick O'Sullivan (a bullock driver)
- George McKenzie as Morgan (bushranger)
- Olive Wilton as Maude Mason (daughter of squatter Mason)
- Eugenie Duggan as Sunday

== Film adaptation ==
The play was turned into the 1910 film Thunderbolt.
