= Thunderbolt (1910 film) =

1910 Australian film

- The Sun 9 November 1910
- Directed by: John Gavin
- Written by: H. A. Forsyth
- Based on: book Three Years with Thunderbolt by William Monckton and Ambrose Pratt play Thunderbolt by Ambrose Pratt
- Produced by: H. A. Forsyth
- Starring: John Gavin
- Cinematography: Alfred J. Moulton
- Production company: Southern Cross Film Enterprise
- Distributed by: West's Pictures (Qld)
- Release date: 12 November 1910
- Running time: 4,000 feet / 66 minutes
- Country: Australia
- Languages: Silent; English intertitles
- Budget: less than £300

Thunderbolt is a 1910 Australian feature film based on the life of the bushranger Captain Thunderbolt. It was the directorial debut of John Gavin who later claimed it was the first "four-reel movie" made in Australia. It has also been called the first film made in New South Wales.

The movie was very successful and launched a cycle of bushranger films until they were banned in 1912.

Unlike most Australian silent films, part of the film survives today.

== Synopsis ==

Frederick Ward is a cattle drover earning money for his wedding when he is accused of cattle theft and sentenced to seven years at Cockatoo Island. He escapes three years later by swimming across the water only to learn that his fiancée, Jess Anson, has died of grief. He seeks his revenge by taking on a life of crime, becoming the bushranger Captain Thunderbolt.

He befriends some aboriginal people, steals a racehorse, "Combo", and robs the Moonbi Mail Coach. He then enters "Combo" in a horse race and wins. He is rescued from a police trap involving Chinese by a half-caste girl, Sunday. He is grateful to her and they get married. He then holds up the Carlisle Hotel, and narrowly escapes. He takes on a boy apprentice and Sunday dies. Thunderbolt then dies in a shoot out with police on the riverbank at Uralla.

=== Chapter headings ===
According to contemporary reports, the various chapter headings were:

Still from film of John Gavin as Thunderbolt

- Arrest of Frederick Ward, Cattle Duffer.
- Death Blow of Jess Anson, his Sweetheart.
- Thunderbolt's Escape from the Quarry and Great Swim.
- Thunderbolt's Vow at the Graveside.
- Aboriginal Kindness and Customs of Australian Blacks.
- Stealing the Racehorse "Combo."
- Bailing up Moonbi Mail Coach.
- The Race for the Cup.
- "Combo" Wins.
- Chinese Cunning and Chinese Strategy.
- "Sunday", the Half-caste Girl, Saving Thunderbolt.
- His Gratitude and Marriage.
- Sticking up the Carlisle Hotel.
- Thunderbolt's Race for Life.
- The Boy Apprentice.
- The Death of Sunday
- The Dramatic Death of Thunderbolt in the River.

== Cast ==
- John Gavin as Thunderbolt
- Ruby Butler as Jess Anson/Sunday
- H.A. Forsyth as Monckton, the boy bushranger
- Charles Henry Lay as the prison gang guard and later the sergeant of police.

== Production ==
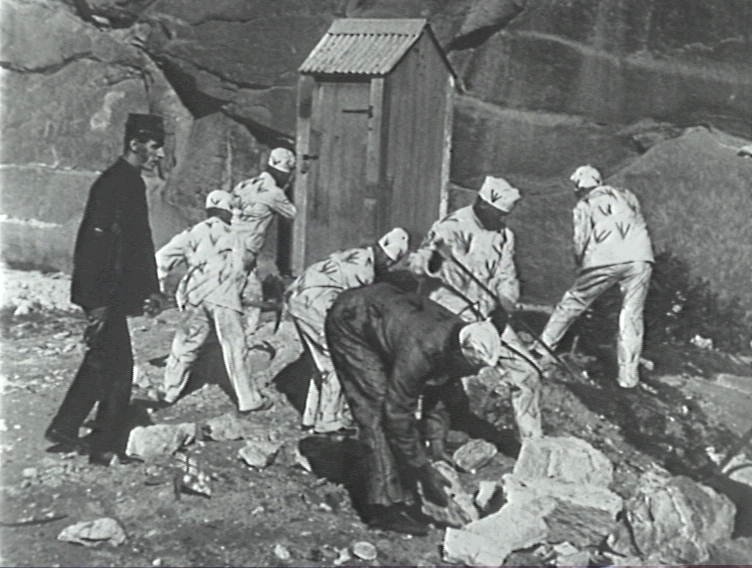
Still from film of Thunderbolt at Cockatoo Island

The film was based on the book Three Years With Thunderbolt and its play adaptation Thunderbolt. R.F. Stephens later claimed he was the one who suggested adapting the play to John Gavin.

H. A. Forsyth produced the film and adapted the play into a screenplay. He also appeared in the film as a young bushranger. John Gavin directed and played the lead role.

The female lead, Ruby Butler, was a model and beauty contest winner.

Because the film was longer than the typical movies of the time Gavin later claimed that "everyone warned him that his venture was doomed to failure".

Shooting took place in October and November 1910 Lithgow and Hartley Vale, with extras recruited from local miners who were then on strike. Forsyth told the press Lithgow was chosen due to its resemblance to the area where Thunderbolt operated. The scene depicting the death of Thunderbolt was shot near the second junction bridge, on tho road from Bowenfels to Rydal. One scene was shot at the Gap, ten miles from Lithgow. Gavin later recalled:

When the troopers had to shoot Thunderbolt with blank cartridges, the lead was taken out and the space filled with hard soap. Being near a brewery, both bushrangers and troopers wore imbibing frequently, with the result that when the chase along the road was to commence, nearly all the supers were pretty nigh ‘full of hops. You can believe me, the American cowboy had nothing on some of that wild bunch.

The shoot reportedly took less than three weeks.

== Reception ==
A film called Thunderbolt, about the bushranger, was screened in Wagga Wagga in February 1910. It is unclear whether this is the Gavin film, which officially premiered in Sydney on 12 November 1910.

The movie was usually screened accompanied by a lecturer.

=== Critical ===
Reviews were generally positive. One critic, for The Newsletter, wrote that:

The film has been admirably produced, being as clear and as distinct as any yet shown in Australia, and great credit is due to the bio operator, Mr. Moulton... Mr. Jack Gavin made an impressive Thunderbolt, being a fine upstanding man, big-enough to fight Jack Johnson; and Mr. Bert Forsyth was all that could be desired as Monkton, the boy bushranger. Mr. H. A. Forsyth is to be congratulated upon the success of his initial attempt at picture production, and his efforts augur well for his success in future efforts.

The Newcastle Herald stated that:

The various scenes were shown with a clearness that lent realism to the picture, which is one of the best ever thrown on the screen in Newcastle. The outlaw's swim from Cockatoo Island, where he had been imprisoned, was a very fine scene, and his theft of a horse followed by his sticking up of the Moonbi mail coach, in which the antics of the passengers caused amusement, was excellent.... The audience showed appreciation by loud applause, which the picture deserved thoroughly.

The Bunbury Southern Times said that the film "is said to be a masterpiece in motion picture cinematography. This picture is full of exciting and sensational plots."

=== Box office ===
The film was a big success at the box office. Gavin said it was "a very successful money maker" that made "a fortune" for its investors. A writer for The Newsletter called it "a boon unprecedented in the annals of local picture showdom." Another article in the same publication said the film was "proving a big draw wherever exhibited, in fact a perfect money spinner, and the firm is troubled to supply the demand the demand made upon their film department."

Thunderbolt was so popular, Forsyth indicated he wanted to make further bushranger movies. The Sunday Sun declared, "Forsyth has a mine of suitable matter right under his hand, and he has already, demonstrated that the "Southern Cross Enterprise" is capable of producing films of a merit, which renders it unnecessary for showmen to seek their cinematographic repertoire abroad." Gavin and Forsyth subsequently went on to make a film about Captain Moonlite. Then the two went their separate ways and Gavin made movies on Ben Hall and Frank Gardiner. In advertising Forsyth would claim he was the "original creator" of the films on Thunderbolt and Moonlite, not mentioning Gavin at all.

Thunderbolt was still screening in theatres as late as 1916. Gavin wanted to re-release the film in 1922 but was unable to do so due to the ban on bushranging films introduced in 1912.

== The film today ==
The film was thought lost but in 1992 1,452 feet of surviving footage constituting 24 minutes was donated to the National Film and Sound Archive in a cake tin. According to the Archive, "the acting in the surviving footage is broad and unconvincing, and several scenes are poorly shot so that the principal action is in fact taking place in the distance rather than the foreground of the shot." Filmink wrote "it's not very good but it's impossible not to have a soft spot for the Gavins."

== Lawsuit ==
In 1929 Gavin successfully sued Australasian Films for £150 over losing a copy of the movie.
