= Assigned to His Wife =

Assigned to his Wife
- Sunday Times 9 Oct 1911
- Directed by: John Gavin
- Written by: Agnes Gavin
- Produced by: John Gavin
- Starring: John Gavin; Agnes Gavin
- Cinematography: A.J. Moulton
- Production company: John F. Gavin Productions
- Distributed by: John Gavin
- Release date: 22 September 1911
- Running time: over 4,000 feet
- Country: Australia
- Language: Silent film
- Budget: £500

Assigned to his Wife is a 1911 Australian silent film from director John Gavin. It is a convict-era "military romantic melodrama".

== Plot ==
Referee 15 Nov 1911

The film is set in the early 1840s in England and Van Diemen's Land and concerns Jack Throsbie (John Gavin), an English soldier who is falsely accused of a crime and sentenced to Australia, where he befriends an aboriginal boy.

The chapter headings were:

1. Colonel McGregor's quarters at Aldershot. Capt. Danvers, the Colonel's secretary, proposes marriage to Miss Bess Wilmot and is refused. Bess confesses her love for Jack Throsbie to whom she is secretly married.
2. Husband and wife.
3. A dastardly reminder. Falsely accused. Court martial held. Condemned to death. A brother's remorse.
4. Transported to Van Diemen's Land.
5. Eight months later. Captain Danvers arrives in Hobart as relieving officer in charge of the settlement. Mrs. Throsbie follow her unhappy husband to Van Diemen's Land. Jack is assigned to his wife.
6. A wolf in sheep's clothing. Jack Throsbie's home. Dennie's happiness.
7. Captain Danvers shows his true colours.
8. A cry for help. Jack Throsbie defends his wife against Captain Danvers. In the Grip of the Law. A Wife's Despair.
9. The deserted hut. Yacka (A. Delaware) and the troopers.
10. To the Bush. The trooper's Discomfiture. The biter bitten. The bush camp. Yacka falls into the hands of the troopers. #Jack Throsbie to the rescue. A dying man's confession. The sensational swim across the river. The escape of the black boy Yacka. The Governor of the settlement (H. Benson) brings Tess news of Jack Throsbie's innocence.
11. Down the rapids.
12. Sensational dive by "the black boy" Yacka.
13. Bess Throsbie's home. Jacks brings news of Jack Throsbie's capture. Husband and wife meet again. Yacka is pardoned.
14. Death of Captain Danvers.
15. Good-bye Van Diemen's Land. England Once more. Honour to whom honour is due. Under the old flag. Yacka the black boy in England.
16. Happiness at last.

The main situations in the film were advertised as being:

- about to be shot for treachery;
- the fight with the guards;
- the blackboy's wonderful escape;
- swimming the river on horseback;
- the fight on the river;
- the flogging.

== Cast ==
- John Gavin as Jack Throsbie
- Agnes Gavin as Bess Wilmot
- H Harding as Captain Denvers
- Carr Austin as Colonel McGregor
- W Power as Harry Wilmot
- J Harris as Sandy McDougall
- H Benson as Governor of the Settlement
- F Henderson as Trooper McGuire
- A. Delaware as Yacko, the Black Boy
- Miss Daphne as Bertha McGregor

== Production ==
The film was shot on location in bush near Sydney and at Gavin's improvised studio in Waverly. A highlight was a dive of 250 feet (76.2 m) by Yacka off a cliff into a river.

== Reception ==
The film was reportedly successful at the box office. The Newsletter said the film "is booming around Sydney, being booked up for about 30 different shows. This success is all the more pleasing when one recollects that it is a purely Australian product. All his dramas have been written and dramatised by his talented wife, Agnes Gavin. They are all acted by Austra lians, whose ability is quite up to, if not ahead of, the oversea products."

It was meant to be followed by another from Gavin The White Hope but it does not appear this was made.

=== Critical ===
The Advertiser called it "a picture of which every Australian should be proud. Among the many sensational incidents is a splendid dive of 250 ft. by a blackboy."

The Sydney Sun said:

A proposal and a rejection of marriage; a clandestine meeting; a theft; a court-martial; a death sentence (afterwards com muted to transportation for life from Eng land to Tasmania); a two-man fight; a fight between more than two men; a fatal accident; a startling confession and a suicide, make a little list which you will admit would be extremely Interesting when pieced toge ther and portrayed by good actors. Such is "Assigned to His Wife"... The Gavins are Australians, the actors are Australians, the scene is mostly Australian, and next week, at the Lyric Theatre, Australians can come and see tho whole Australian thing. They certainly ought to, because It is well worth seeing.
