= Trooper O'Brien =

1928 film

- Poster of film
- Directed by: John Gavin
- Written by: Agnes Gavin
- Produced by: Herbert Finlay
- Starring: John Gavin
- Cinematography: Arthur Higgins
- Edited by: John McGeorge
- Production company: Australian Artists Company
- Distributed by: Herbert Finlay
- Release date: 23 May 1928 (Sydney)
- Running time: 77 minutes (5,500 feet)
- Country: Australia
- Languages: Silent; English intertitles
- Budget: £1,000

Trooper O'Brien is a 1928 Australian silent film from the team of John and Agnes Gavin. It was a melodrama set during the "Ned Kelly era" about an orphaned girl raised by a policeman in the bush. It is one of the rare early Australian films that still exist in its entirety.

== Plot ==
The film begins with Mr Alston telling his son John that he does not approve of his marriage and wants nothing more to do with him. After Mr Alston goes back inside the house Mrs Alston speaks with her son and gives the granddaughter Winnie a parting gift of a trinket. Mr Alston, Jr. then leaves with his wife and daughter and changes his surname to Brown.

About 3 years later the now Mr Brown, his wife and daughter are living in the bush. There is a fire and they have to flee the area. As they flee they crash their wagon. Mr & Mrs Brown die in the accident but their daughter Winnie survives and is found by two boys, Glen O'Brien (Jimmy McMahon) and his aboriginal friend Moori (Reg Quartly). Winnie is taken back to Glen's house and because her parents are dead and there is no way of tracing any other family she lives with them.

As the years pass Glen O'Brien (now played by Gordon Collingridge) follows family tradition and pursues a career in the Police Force. Before leaving for Sydney he proposes to Winnie (Merle Ridgeway). In Sydney Glen O'Brien attends a house where Mr and Mrs Alston are being robbed. He arrests the robbers along with the help of his childhood friend Moori (Will Harris).

Back in the bush Glen returns and marries Winnie. While there he takes Winnie back to the spot where he found her as a child and they discover a metal box. Glen receives a visit from Mr & Mrs Alston who have come to thank him for his assistance. Before the Alston's leave Glen shows his father the metal box. His father tells him that years ago he found some items of the dead woman Mrs Brown. His father uses the key to open the metal box and inside they find the trinket. Mrs Alston sees the trinket and immediately knows that it is the one she gave to her granddaughter. It is at this point that Mr & Mrs Alston's realise that Winnis is their granddaughter.

== Cast ==
- John Gavin as Trooper O'Brien
- Merle Ridgeway as Winnie
- Gordon Collingridge as Glen O'Brien
- Sybil Atholwood as Mrs Alston Jnr
- Charles Stanford as John Alston
- Nellie Ferguson as Mrs Alston
- Ernest Lauri as John Alston Jnr
- Jimmy McMahon as Glen O'Brien as a child
- Reg Quartly as Moori as a child
- Betty Taylor as Winnie as a child
- Cis Peachy as Mrs O'Brien
- Martin Kelly as Detective Burns
- Will Harris as Moori
- Violet Elliot as the budgeree flapper
- Walter Vincent as Reverend Matthews
- Carlton Stuart
- William Thornton

== Production ==
Gavin made the film after spending several years in Hollywood, and was reunited with his old associate Herbert Finlay. Together they formed Australian Artists Company to make the movie, which was originally shot under the title The Key of Fate. The film was made in late 1926.

The movie features extracts from old 1920 silent films, The Kelly Gang and Robbery Under Arms. Several changes had to be made to appease the censor, including the shooting of Sergeant O'Brien's brother by bushrangers, insertion of scenes depicting police training and a foreword praising the police, and changing the title to Trooper O'Brien. Herbert Finlay said the film was a tribute to police.

Violet Ellis and Will Harris played comic aboriginal characters in black face.

== Reception ==
The film was given a private screening on 12 April 1928 in Sydney. The Evening News said "the story is a good one and is well told and acted throughout." However, when the movie was officially released critical response was poor, the reviewer from the Sydney Morning Herald stating that "it has the faults of some Australian productions, and few of the virtues." Another critic from the same paper thought that:

The story wanders vaguely on; the actors key themselves up to tremendous emotional stress over situations that are not essentially dramatic; and there Is no sense of proportion whatever. In one place, the trooper begins to tell a story about his brother, and for ten minutes or so the spectators are regaled with cattle-stealing and bush ranging scenes; but what these scenes have to do with the principal characters is never disclosed.

Despite this the movie was popular at the box office. However it proved to be John Gavin's last film as director.

The film managed to secure a release in the UK as a quota picture.
