= Keane of Kalgoorlie (novel) =

1907 novel by Arthur Wright

Keane of Kalgoorlie: A Tale of the Sydney Cup
- Author: Arthur Wright
- Language: English
- Publisher: Sunday Times Newspaper Company
- Publication date: 1907
- Publication place: Australia

Keane of Kalgoorlie is a 1907 Australian novel by Arthur Wright that was adapted into a play and film.

Arthur Wright's story was first published in the Referee in 1906. He expanded it into a novel, which was published the following year by the Sunday Times Company.

== Plot ==
Frank Keane is in love with Tess Morton but they have no money, so he decides to leave his home in Sydney and seek his fortune in the Kalgoorlie goldfields. Two years later he and his friends, including Harold Ross, strike it rich. But then Frank receives a letter informing him that Tess has married the villainous Gregory Harris.

Eight years later, Harris has fallen into financial trouble, stolen from Tess, served a stint in gaol. Frank has become very wealthy and returns to Sydney. Frank learns from Harold Ross why Tess married Harris: Frank and his friend needed money on the goldfields to keep digging. Harris promised Ross £100 if he would forge Frank's handwriting and send a letter from the goldfields claiming that Frank had married a barmaid; Ross did this and a heartbroken Tess then married Harris. Ross asks Frank for some money to help him but Frank refuses. Ross is later found dead in the Domain, having been murdered by Harris.

Frank and Tess are reunited and visit the Randwick Races together, where they are spotted by Harris. Harris is spending money he has stolen from Ross.

Harris tries to destroy Keane's horse, which is running against one of his own in the Sydney Cup. When Harris dies, he contrives things so that Keane is blamed for his death. Eventually however, Keane's horse wins the race and he is proved innocent and reunited with Tess.

== Reception ==
The book was popular with readers and launched Wright's career.

A critic from the Advertiser compared the book to the works of Nat Gould and said it "makes no claim to any high order of merit, yet it is as readable as many sensational stories of a more pretentious character... the story is written by one who has evidently seen a good deal of the darker side of life and is well acquainted with the turf, two important qualifications for the production of a work intended only to amuse... ought to find many readers."

== Theatre adaptation ==
Keane of Kalgoorlie
- Original language: English
- Written by: Edward William O'Sullivan; Arthur Wright
- Genre: Melodrama

Premiere
- Date: 18 April 1908
- Place: Haymarket Hippodrome, Sydney, New South Wales

The book was adapted into a play that premiered in 1908.

Wright thought the novel had possibilities as a play and approached Edward William O'Sullivan, who had written the successful plays Cooee and Eureka Stockade for his opinion. O'Sullivan was enthusiastic and encouraged Wright to write the story up as a play, offering to rewrite it for him. This was done, although O'Sullivan later said "it did not require much alteration, as Mr. Wright had the true dramatic instinct." O'Sullivan recommended the play to theatre entrepreneur E. I. Cole in early 1908.

=== Productions ===
The production debuted at the Sydney Hippodrome on 18 April 1908 and starred W.H. Ayr as Frank and Amy Sherwood as Tess.

The critic from The Sunday Times said that the play:

Is full of local color, from the opening scene, enacted in the Domain during the Commonwealth festivities, to the running of the Sydney Cup at Randwick. Some realistic Incidents are portrayed, including the burning of Keane's stables, and an attempt on the life of the Sydney Cup favorite: the trial of the hero on a false charge at the Central Criminal Court; a two-up school, in which the game is followed by a police raid; a house in Woolloomooloo, where Keane is imprisoned, and tho final settling at Randwick. Tho story is an interesting one, and being well interwoven with a sporting element, should appeal to a large section of playgoers.

The Sydney Morning Herald was more guarded, stating that:

The production was far from well mounted, but it was well acted, and with better stage dressing would prove a decided draw. Although occasionally one's sense of probabilities was shocked during the stage unfolding of the story, on tho whole the play proved one of coherence, reasonably dramatic situations, and humour... The scenes in which boxing and two up wore presented were by no means convincing. The boxers gave a very poor display, devoid of cleverness, and the two-up episode and raid was a weak parody of the real thing... The authors must have been gratified with the storm of approval that arose near the conclusion of the drama from the great audience.

The Evening News said the play "presents several stirring situations in a story which is fairly well-developed."

Public response appears to have been enthusiastic and there were further productions throughout the rest of the decade.
