= Frank Gardiner, the King of the Road =

1911 film

- Newcastle Herald 27 Sept 1911
- Directed by: John Gavin
- Written by: Agnes Gavin
- Produced by: Herbert Finlay; Stanley Crick
- Starring: John Gavin
- Cinematography: Herbert Finlay
- Production company: JG Films
- Distributed by: Cricks and Finlay
- Release date: 27 February 1911
- Running time: 3,500 feet (45 mins)
- Country: Australia
- Languages: Silent; English intertitles
- Budget: £300

Frank Gardiner, the King of the Road is a 1911 Australian film about the bushranger Frank Gardiner, played by John Gavin, who also directed. It was the fourth consecutive bushranger biopic Gavin made, following movies about Captain Thunderbolt, Captain Moonlite and Ben Hall.

It is considered a lost film.

== Plot ==
The movie consists of 25 scenes. Frank Gardiner, real name Frank Christie (John Gavin), is a Goulburn boy accused of theft by his father, and ordered to quit. He meets his future wife Annie Brown and starts bushranging. His sweetheart's father throws her into the sea but Gardiner saves her.

Gardiner partners with John Peisley in stealing horses. He is arrested and put in Pentridge Prison. He successfully escapes and joins Peisley. They rob the mailman and police. Then he steals over 2,000oz of gold on the Bendigo goldfields. He is chased by the troopers, but escapes to the Gumtree Inn, where Annie Brown's stepfather, in revenge, informs the police of Gardiner's whereabouts, and the latter is arrested. Annie Brown, then pays her debt of gratitude by pluckily bailing up the police and effecting Gardiner's escape to the bushrangers' cave in the mountains.

Then Annie and Frank leave for Queensland, and engage in storekeeping, but four years later the police identify him, and he is again arrested, and sentenced to 32 years' hard labor.

In Darlinghurst Gaol he again meets Brown, who attempts to murder a warder, but is frustrated by Gardiner. Brown attempts, as a revenge, to kill the little daughter of the governor of the gaol, but again Gardiner prevents the crime, and for this, after 10 years' hard labor, is released, and exiled to America, where he goes with his wife and daughter, and the closing scene is laid at his house in San Francisco, where he has adopted the motto, "Honesty is the best policy."

According to the Evening News, "There are unrehearsed incidents in it also. One is where the troopers riding furiously after the bushrangers race through a ford In a river. One of the horses comes down with his rider, who is injured, while the animal sustained damaged knees. Again Gardiner fires a pistol point blank in a trooper's face. and the latter, of course, is burnt and blackened with the powder. Had there been a bullet in the weapon he surely would have been 'counted out'."

=== Sample headings ===
- " The accusation,"
- " The denial,"
- " A father' sceurse,"
- " The old man's sorrow"
- " My son"
- " Gardiner's home,"
- " Annie Brown's home"
- " Brutal' stepfather,"
- "Fear of her life,"
- " Madman's fury,"
- " A fateful meeting,"
- " Attempted murder,"
- " Frank Gardiner to the rescue"
- " Sensational dive."

== Cast ==
- John Gavin as Frank Gardiner
- Alf Scarlett
- Mr. Mainsbridge, wife and daughter
- Charlie Lay
- John ("Fatty") Harris

== Production ==
John Gavin had starred in and directed two bushranger biopics for H. A. Forsyth, Thunderbolt and Moonlite before leaving Forsyth and going into business for himself with his own company, JG Films. He made two more bushranger biopics, Ben Hall and His Gang followed by Frank Gardiner, which was announced on 9 January 1911. Gavin's wife Agnes wrote the script.

During the shooting of a scene where troopers were chasing after Gardiner, a horse collapsed and damaged its knee. In another scene which apparently made the final cut, Gardiner fires a pistol point blank in a trooper's face, and the latter was burnt and blackened with the powder.

== Reception ==
The film was previewed in February 1911.

The film played in cinemas around the same time as other Gavin directed bushranger films, Moonlite and Ben Hall.

The Evening News called it "splendidly arranged... there are 25 scenes well dramatlsed and well photographed... received with evident pleasure by those present, and applause was frequent. Messrs Cricks, Finlay and Gavin were congratulated on their enterprise."

According to the Zeehan Herald, "the sensational incidents of the great out-law's career were beautifully screened. The various scenes were intimately interwoven, and the story could be readily followed throughout. Time after time the large audience showed their appreciation by vigorous applause, and quite a storm of clapping and cheering greeted the conclusion of the film, which was, owing to its unusual length (4,000ft) shown in three parts."

One critic thought that:

The best points about it is Gardiner's rescue of Annie Brown from drowning, the delivery from a convict's assault of the gaol governor's little daughter, and the finale where the ex-bushranger, exiled to America, at length (after a bitter goal experience) realizes the fact that "Honesty is the best Policy," which he seeks to inculcate apparently into his daughter and his daughter's sweetheart. That it is a thrilling continuation of desperate scenes that should never have occurred in Australia goes without saying, but it has the extremely bad tendency of holding up to the juvenile portion of the audience (who applauded most vociferously whenever law and order was trampled upon) an utter contempt for one of the most useful, respectable and reputable body of men in the Government service- the police.
