= H. A. Forsyth =

Australian film producer

Bert Forsyth (H. A. Forsyth)
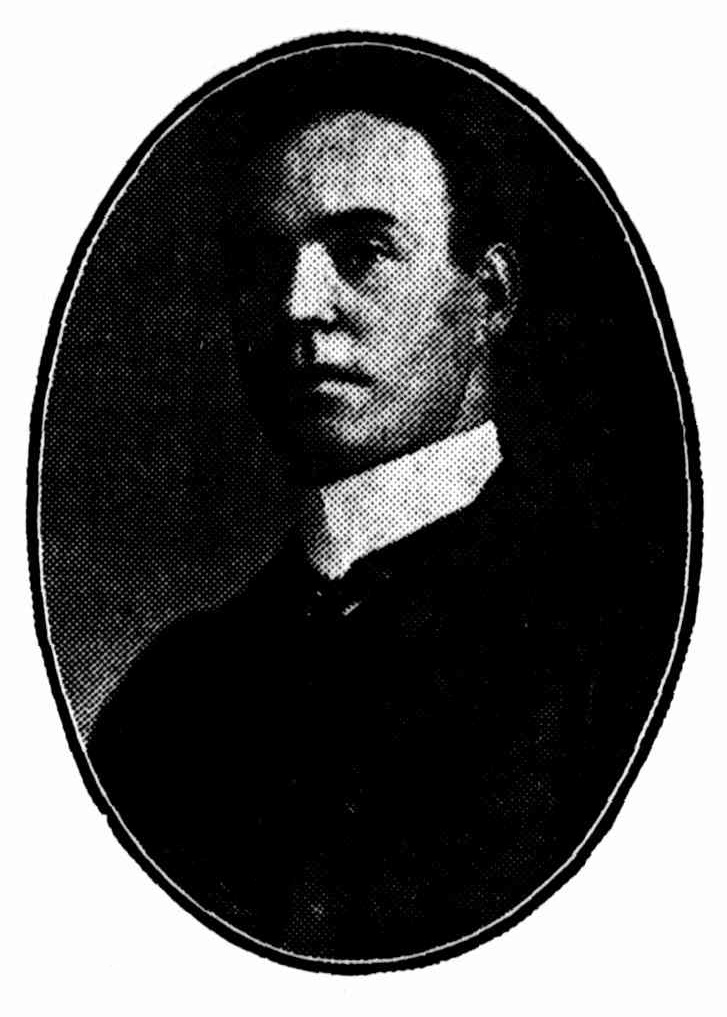
- Portrait of H. A. Forsyth (published in November 1910).
- Born: Henry Albert Forsyth; 8 October 1872; Parkes, New South Wales, Australia
- Died: 18 May 1959 (aged 86); Gosford, New South Wales, Australia
- Occupation: film producer
- Spouse(s): (1) Marie Hammond (2) Mary Willett (3) Nancy Duncan
- Parent(s): Allen Forsyth & Sarah LaFranchi (née Standen)

Henry Albert ('Bert') Forsyth, known professionally as H. A. Forsyth (and informally as Bert Forsyth), was a pioneer of Australian film production during the silent era. From about 1907 to 1909 Forsyth worked as a travelling picture showman, screening the film Robbery Under Arms in Australian country towns. In 1910 his company, Southern Cross Motion Pictures, produced and released two successful motion pictures, Thunderbolt and Moonlite, based on incidents in the careers of the bushrangers Frederick Ward and Andrew Scott. For these projects Forsyth worked with Jack Gavin, who directed both films and acted in the lead roles. In January 1913 the New South Wales Government banned Forsyth's bushranger films (as part of a wider ban on the bushranging genre). At various stages in his career Bert Forsyth also managed theatres that screened motion pictures.

== Biography ==
=== Early years ===
Henry Albert Forsyth was born on 8 October 1872 at Bushman's Lead in the Central West of New South Wales (renamed Parkes in 1873), the son of Allen Forsyth and Sarah LaFranchi (née Standen). Before the birth of her son Sarah had been married to Antonio ('Peter') LaFranchi, so Bert had six older half-sisters. LaFranchi had abandoned his family in about 1868 when he travelled to the gold-fields near Warwick in Queensland to attend to the affairs of his brother (who died in August that year). During LaFranchi's absence Sarah formed a relationship with Allen Forsyth, with whom she had two sons, Allen Edgar ('Eddie') born in 1871 and Henry Albert ('Bert') born the following year. By about 1873 Peter LaFranchi had returned to the district and he and Sarah resumed their relationship, with Bert and his brother being raised within the LaFranchi household at Grenfell. Sarah and Peter LaFranchi had three more daughters, but the marriage finally broke down by about 1880. Sarah subsequently formed a relationship with Lars Madsen by whom she had four sons, born from 1881 to 1888 at Cudgellico and Young.

Bert Forsyth's interest in bushrangers probably began as a childhood fascination. The goldfields of the Forbes, Grenfell and Young districts had been a focus of outlaw activity only a decade before his birth. The famous bushranger Ben Hall was shot dead in May 1865, in a police ambush near Billabong Creek, south-west of Parkes. In his formative years young Bert Forsyth would have been aware of stories of famous bushrangers who had operated in the district, such as Hall, Frank Gardiner, Johnny Gilbert and Jack O'Meally, and probably met people with first-hand accounts (both positive and negative) of their activities.

Forsyth was an expert horseman. Lines of verse written about Forsyth, published in the Sydney Sportsman newspaper in 1911, make reference to his horsemanship: "He's been a rider of renown, / And owned and trained his prads, you know".

Forsyth may have had experience as an actor. Lines of the verse in the Sydney Sportsman suggest he performed in a stage-play of Robbery Under Arms, which had been adapted for the stage by Alfred Dampier and Garnet Walch in 1890 and proved to be a popular theatrical production over many years in Australia. The verse reads: "In Boldrewood's great piece he played. / They say that he was all the rage / As in a bright red shirt arrayed / He strutted up and down the stage".

=== First marriage ===
Bert Forsyth and Marie Hammond were married on 14 May 1900 in Sydney (according to the rites of the Roman Catholic church). The couple lived in the Newcastle suburb of Hamilton. After their marriage (according to Forsyth's later testimony) the couple "were happy for about two months", but then he noticed his wife was beginning to "drink to excess". Later Marie told him she was going to Sydney, as living at Hamilton was "too quiet". One day, when Forsyth arrived home, he found his wife had left. Forsyth met with his wife in Sydney on a number of occasions in the following years, but each time she refused to return to live with him.

In January 1906 Forsyth travelled to America "on business" (probably to San Francisco). In the early morning of 18 April 1906 a major earthquake struck California, with its epicentre near San Francisco, causing considerable damage and loss of life. The opening lines of the verse published in the Sydney Sportsman implies Forsyth was managing a theatre in San Francisco at the time of the earthquake, which destroyed the building: "He's been up to all sorts of games / He ran a show in 'Frisco town; / This man, 'twas he brought on the 'quake / Which tumbled flat his theatre down". Forsyth returned to Australia later that year. In a later newspaper article, Forsyth is described as a man "who has considerable globe trotting experience".

In December 1906 after his return from America, Forsyth applied for a divorce from his wife Marie on the ground of desertion. At the time he was working as an insurance agent. After Forsyth had testified to the court, outlining the basis for his petition, a decree nisi was granted. Forsyth's divorce from Marie was finalised in February 1908.

=== Travelling picture show ===
For three years (probably 1907 to 1909) Forsyth worked as a travelling moving picture showman, touring the film Robbery Under Arms "into every nook and corner of Australia". Two motion picture versions of Robbery Under Arms had been produced in 1907, one by the Tait brothers and the other by Charles MacMahon, but the particular version that was toured by Forsyth has not been determined. Forsyth later recalled having "as many as three or four people on the job to get the film through" the old projector machine. He added: "Two dozen stoppages and breaks was a common occurrence; the lighting obtained from the limelight was certainly very soft and restful to the eye, but at times little could be seen of the picture". Notwithstanding the difficulties and shortcomings, Forsyth later claimed the audiences "were carried away with enthusiasm at the wonderful exhibition they saw". Forsyth exhibited Robbery Under Arms "over and over again at the same places" and often "the return visits drew larger houses than on the first occasion".

=== Theatre management ===
By 1909 Bert Forsyth was managing the Regent Music Hall in Regent Street, Redfern, the first building in the Sydney suburbs utilised for the screening of motion pictures. The brother of Forsyth's ex-wife, Herbert Hammond, also worked at the Regent Music Hall as a projector operator. The theatre had begun showing films by July 1907.

On the evening of 29 April 1910 the film Robbery Under Arms was shown in the Masonic Hall in Cobar, in the central west of New South Wales. Advertised as "Forsyth's Stirring Picture Drama", the film was brought to Cobar by Herbert Hammond. The screening "drew a good house" but was considered to be "a very indifferent show" by the writer for the local newspaper. The writer commented: "The light was poor, the pictures small and the programme ended about 9.30 – a combination of features which Cobar people dislike".^{[A]}

=== Film production ===
==== Thunderbolt ====
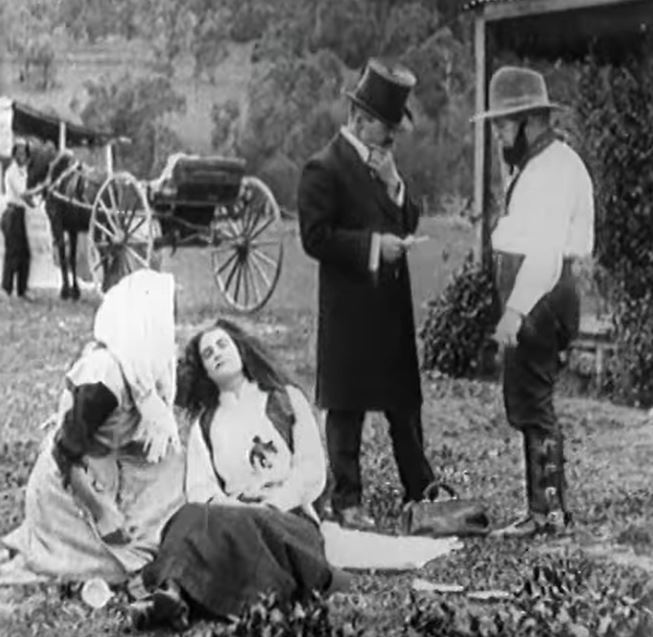
A still from the Thunderbolt film: Jess Anson in a state of collapse after learning her fiancé, Frederick Ward, had been imprisoned for cattle duffing (attended by her parents and Dr. Jenkins).

Forsyth's first moving picture production was Thunderbolt, based on incidents in the career of the bushranger Captain Thunderbolt (Frederick Ward). Thunderbolt was portrayed by Jack Gavin (who is also credited as the director of the film) and Forsyth himself took on the role of William Monckton, the bushranger's young acolyte. Ruby Butler played the dual roles of Jess Anson (Fred Ward's fiancée) and the Aboriginal girl Sunday. The camera operator was Alfred J. Moulton, who had cinematography experience working for Pathé Frères (that had a branch office in Sydney).^{[B]}

Thunderbolt was filmed in and around Lithgow during a two-to-three week period in October 1910. The Lithgow district "was specially selected by reason of the suitability of its surroundings". During the shooting of the film miners at Lithgow were on strike and a number were recruited as extras and "used in minor parts, such as bushrangers and mounted troopers". The footage depicting the death of Thunderbolt was filmed at a place known as "the second junction bridge" on the road between Bowenfels and Rydal. For the scenes that involved firearms, cartridges were used with the lead removed and replaced with soap. During the filming of the death of Captain Thunderbolt, the actor Jack Gavin later recalled that "the hard soap pellets had perforated my clothes in many places".

The completed film was reported to be a four-reel movie of over three thousand feet in length. A later article in Sydney's The Arrow newspaper claimed Thunderbolt was the first four-reel film ever produced (at a time when the average length of a dramatic film was from 800 to 900 feet). An article in November 1910 in Sydney's The Newsletter described the completed Thunderbolt as a film that was "admirably produced, being as clear and as distinct as any yet shown in Australia". In mid-November Forsyth had an advertisement published in The Sun newspaper addressed "To Showmen", advising of the availability of his newly finished film Thunderbolt ("The Film That Draws the Crowd"). Thunderbolt was first screened in mid-December 1910 in the Queen's Theatre in Pitt Street in Sydney. In early December 1910 it was reported that the film depicting Thunderbolt the bushranger was "proving a big draw wherever exhibited, in fact a perfect money spinner", and Southern Cross Motion Pictures "is troubled to supply the demand made upon their film department". Forsyth, the manager, advised that "they have several other bushranging films in course of preparation".

==== Moonlite ====
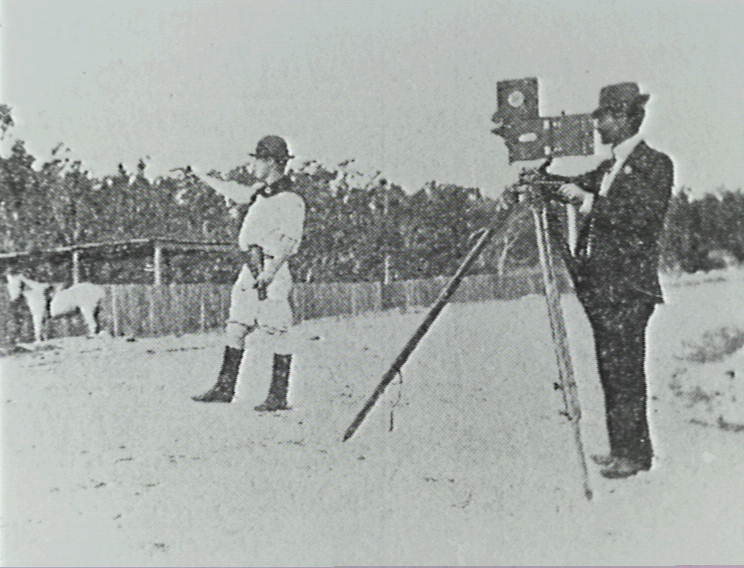
On location filming Moonlite: "Mr. H. A. Forsyth gives instruction in the art and practice of using a gun" (The Sun, 5 January 1911).

Forsyth's film about Thunderbolt was followed by another based on the career of Captain Moonlite (Andrew Scott). The screenplay for Moonlite was written by Forsyth and the cinematography carried out by A. J. Moulton. In a later interview Jack Gavin claimed his wife Agnes was also involved in writing the screenplay. Moonlite was filmed using the same ensemble of actors in the major roles, with Gavin taking the role of Captain Moonlite and credited as the director of the film. Ruby Butler played 'Ruth Clarke', the love-interest in the film, and Forsyth also acted in the production. Gavin's wife Agnes played the role of the Aboriginal woman 'Bunda Bunda'.

The filming of Moonlite was carried out from November to mid-December 1910 and was reported to have involved over 200 people. Another account states that the production involved "over 50 actors" and twenty horses.

The film was shot at various locations in and around Sydney and Lithgow. Some of the Sydney locations used in the film were the Grosvenor Hotel, Sydney Harbour off Pyrmont (near Glebe Island), Lane Cove River and Parramatta River. In one of the scenes filmed in late November 1910, Jack Gavin as Moonlite makes his escape from the police by jumping from a vessel into Sydney Harbour. A suitable vessel had been found, anchored near Glebe Island. After Gavin dived from the poop deck of the vessel, 18 feet into the water, "to the horror of his confreres, a shark was noticed making for him". Forsyth, "with admirable presence of mind", grabbed a dog and threw it overboard "to distract the attention of the monster of the deep, and at the same time shouting instructions to all hands to fire off revolvers containing blank cartridges". The distractions were successful and Gavin was pulled aboard.

The finished film was 3,750 feet in length and was reported to have been produced at a cost of over one thousand pounds.

In late December 1910 Southern Cross Motion Pictures, under Forsyth's management, opened a new theatre in Sydney on the corner of Rawson Place and Pitt Street (opposite Central railway station). The theatre was rudimentary, basically an open-air enclosure where films could be shown. An advance screening of Moonlite was shown at the Rawson Place theatre on 30 December 1910 to "representatives of the press and a number of gentlemen interested in biographical work". The theatre was officially opened the following night with the first public screening of Forsyth's new motion picture, Moonlite. During January 1911 Thunderbolt was also shown, as well as another locally made film, Fred Fox, the Snake King, featuring the handling of snakes near Sydney. Later that month Southern Cross Pictures introduced new material, described as a "series of historical, dramatic, and humorous moving pictures". Films shown in mid-January included titles such as A Little Child Shall Lead Them and A Romance of the Rockies. In March 1911, "in addition to the usual instalment" of motion pictures, the Southern Cross Picture Palace included sheep shearing exhibitions and contests "between shearers who have the reputation of being 'ringers'".

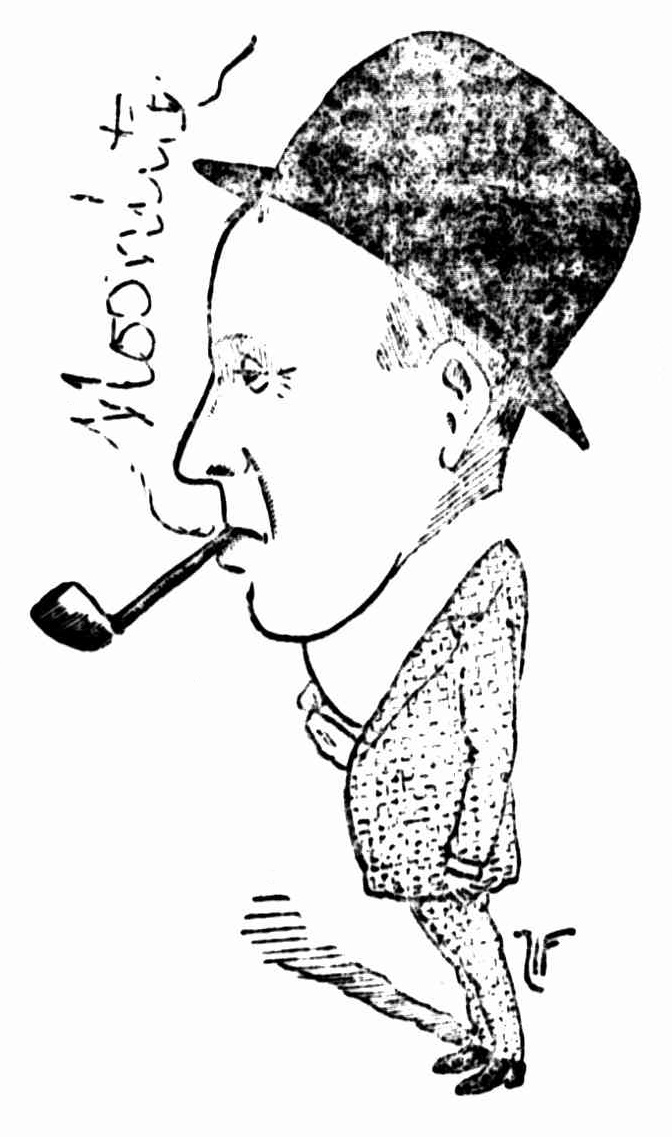
Caricature of Bert Forsyth ("a well-known Picture Showman"), published in Sydney Sportsman, 22 February 1911.

==== The Miner's Gift ====
A comment in an interview given by Jack Gavin in 1923 suggests Forsyth may have travelled overseas in 1911 after Moonlite was made and being shown around the country: "Forsyth, having made considerable money, went on a world's tour". If so, he had returned by about November 1911 to produce another film.

The Miner's Gift was probably filmed in about November 1911; it was being shown at the Hippodrome cinema in Newtown from 11 to 13 December 1911. The Miner's Gift was a film of three thousand feet length with the subtitle The Fight for Fortune, described as "The Australian Mining Drama". It was shown in late December 1911 at Herbert's Pictures at Islington in Newcastle. It was shown at the Pictoria cinema in Maitland on 30 December 1911.. The film was presented with a special lecturer in attendance.

An article about the screening of the film at Benalla in late May 1915 described the plot as incorporating "love, robbery, and an apparent murder by a tribe of blacks, culminating in the burning of a bush home and the rescue therefrom of a digger's sweetheart and a Chinaman".

On 18 December 1911 a notice was published in The Age newspaper announcing that H. A. Forsyth of the Southern Cross Film Company had arrived in Melbourne "with the company's latest production", the film The Miner's Gift. The advertisement recommended: "Showmen, get busy and book this money getter".

==== The bushranger ban ====
Bert Forsyth and Mary ('Marie') Willett were married on 2 March 1912 at St. Stephen's Presbyterian church in Phillip Street in Sydney. Marie Willett had been an actress with William Anderson's Dramatic Company, a touring theatre group.

In May 1912 it was reported that Forsyth was managing Arcade Pictures at Newtown. By July 1912 Forsyth was negotiating to extend the Arcade Picture Palace to have its frontage on King Street by incorporating the site of the adjoining Hatte's Arcade. In August 1912 it was reported that Arcade Pictures at Newtown was to be formed into a company.

In November 1912 regulations were gazetted in New South Wales "to govern the screening of cinematograph films" under the "Theatres and Public Halls Act, 1908". The new regulations specifically banned the exhibition of "successful crime such as bushranging, robberies, or other act of lawlessness, which might reasonably be considered as having an injurious influence on youthful minds". Motion picture programmes, together with a synopsis of each item, were required to be submitted to the police for inspection and approval (with a possible further requirement to screen the films "for the information of the police"). The regulations allowed for a penalty of up to £20 for a breach of the regulations.

The Federated Picture Showmen's Association of New South Wales responded by issuing a lengthy circular arguing against the new censorship regulations. A subsequent statement by the Acting Colonial Secretary Frederick Flowers made it apparent the regulations were primarily targeting films that depicted "bushranging episodes", where the police are "frequently represented as acting in the most ridiculous and incompetent manner, and often as creators of crime". Flowers' statement supported the view by many in the industry that the negative representations of police in these films was a prime motivator of the changes.

In late January 1913 the New South Wales Colonial Secretary James McGowen used his powers under section 27 of the "Theatres and Public Halls Act, 1908" to specifically prohibit the exhibition "of the cinematograph films entitled 'Thunderbolt' and 'Moonlite'". Section 27 authorised the Minister to prohibit "the holding of any public entertainment" (such as motion pictures) "if the Minister is of the opinion that it is fitting for the preservation of good manners and decorum".

The banning of bushranger-themed films by government regulation in New South Wales coincided with a period of industry restructuring, with the large cinema exhibitors and film distribution network in Australia favouring American imports, leading to a decline in independent theatres and touring circuits and a reluctance to support Australian film production.

In September 1913 Forsyth was recorded as a theatrical agent and manager of the Star Picture Palace at Parramatta.

=== The war years and after ===
Forsyth's occupation was recorded as an "Amusements Manager" when he enlisted in the Australian Imperial Force at Holsworthy in late-September 1915 (a week short of his 43rd birthday). His next of kin was recorded as his wife Mary, then living at 20 Linthorpe Street in Newtown. Forsyth was placed in the 5th Squadron (2nd Remount Unit) and embarked for overseas service in November 1915. The Remount units were given the task of training and caring for the Australian horses during the Sinai and Palestine campaigns. Enlisted men placed in the Remount units were often older (with a maximum age of 50), a high proportion of whom were Boer War veterans and expert horsemen. In March 1916 Forsyth suffered from a sprained knee and was hospitalised in Egypt. He rejoined his unit at the Heliopolis Camp near Cairo in May, but was demobilised in June 1916 and returned to Australia aboard the hospital ship H.S. Itonus.

After the war ended Forsyth was employed as a "film exchange officer" by Harry Musgrove's First National Films and Australasian Films. Film exchanges were film distribution businesses that rented out motion pictures to theatres, a business process that suited flexible and frequent program changes.

In 1923 Forsyth was responsible for organising a song competition for The Manly Daily newspaper which offered prizes of £50 to compose a musical score to match the lyrics of Manly By the Sea, written by Mr. H. C. Bailey of Waterloo. The short-listed entries were presented in a series of concerts. The first of ten concerts was held at the Dungowan Theatre in early March, presenting six of the selected compositions for adjudication. Later that year Forsyth organised an art competition for The Manly Daily on the theme of "Beauties of Manly", culminating in an exhibition which opened in December 1923.

A branch of the Australian Natives' Association was formed at Manly in July 1924, with H. A. Forsyth as its vice-president.

=== Later years ===
By 1930 Bert Forsyth was living in Botany Street in Bondi Junction, in Sydney's eastern suburbs. His occupation was recorded as an agent on the 1930 electoral roll.

Evidence from electoral rolls indicate that Forsyth had separated from his second wife. From about the mid-1930s Forsyth and a woman named Nancy Duncan were living in a de facto relationship (with Nancy listed on the rolls as 'Nancy Forsyth'). The couple eventually married in January 1959, four months before Bert Forsyth's death. By 1937 Bert and Nancy Forsyth were living at 257 Victoria Street in Darlinghurst. Bert's occupation was recorded as an agent on the 1937 electoral roll. By March 1940, when Forsyth enlisted in the Citizen Military Forces, his occupation was recorded as "Auditor Clerk" and he and Nancy were still living in Victoria Street, Darlinghurst.

Forsyth enlisted in the Australian Military Forces at Paddington in March 1940, and was placed in the Citizen Forces. His enlistment record shows his date of birth as 8 October 1878, so his age was recorded as 62 years. Forsyth was actually aged 68 years, so he probably gave false information to stay within a required upper age limit. On the section for the next of kin, the name originally entered was "Marie Forsyth", but "Marie" was crossed out and "Nancy" written above (the change initialled by Forsyth).

Forsyth was initially attached to the "Artillery Wing" at Liverpool, but in late May was transferred to Pay Corps at the Moore Park Showgrounds. He was promoted to Corporal in December 1940. In January 1943 Forsyth was discharged from the Army; his record was notated: "Services no longer required, there being no suitable vacancy in which his services could be utilised in view of his age". By 1943 Bert and Nancy Forsyth were living at 32 Cook Road in Centennial Park. Bert's occupation was recorded as a soldier in the information collected for the 1943 electoral roll.

By December 1945 Forsyth was living at Killcare, on the New South Wales Central Coast. In 1949 the electoral roll shows that Bert and Nancy Forsyth were living in Killcare Road, Killcare, with Bert recorded as having "no occupation".

On 2 January 1959 Forsyth and Nancy Duncan were married in Sydney (his third marriage).

Bert Forsyth died on 18 May 1959 in Gosford on the Central Coast of New South Wales, aged 86 years. He was buried in the Anglican section of the Point Clare cemetery.

== Filmography ==
- Thunderbolt (1910) – producer, actor.
- Moonlite (1910) (a.k.a. Captain Moonlite) – producer, writer, actor.
- The Miner's Gift (1911) – "a story of early Australian mining days".

== Notes ==
A. The motion picture Robbery Under Arms, screened at Cobar in April 1910, was either the Tait Brothers version or the MacMahon version. The fact that it was advertised in the Cobar Herald as "Forsyth's Stirring Picture Drama" probably indicates that Forsyth was well-known in the district as a travelling showman who in recent years had toured this film. Also, a travelling picture showman would tend to have a proprietorial attitude to the films they screened. In the early years of exhibiting moving pictures in Australia a film "was sold by the producer straight out to a showman, who when he had shown it sufficiently, sold it to another showman". In 1910 Forsyth was probably still managing the Regent Street theatre in Redfern, but at that time his employee Herbert Hammond may have been touring films in country towns.

B. Alfred J. Moulton was born in 1873 in the Mount Gambier district of South Australia. He was a pioneer cinematographer in Australia, being employed for four years by Pathé Frères, the French film equipment and production company. In October 1909 Pathé Frères was contracted by the Western Australia government "for cinematograph pictures of scenes and industries" for the purposes of advertising the "great natural resources" of the state. Soon afterwards Moulton travelled to Kalgoorlie for the purpose of taking biograph pictures illustrating the gold mining industry. Moulton also worked for Wests Pictures Ltd. Moulton lived at Summer Hill in Sydney and died in July 1924, aged 51 years, at the Lewisham Private Hospital after a short illness.
