= The Assigned Servant =

- Newcastle Herald 1 Nov 1911
- Directed by: John Gavin
- Written by: Agnes Gavin
- Produced by: Herbert Finlay; Stanley Crick
- Starring: John Gavin
- Cinematography: Herbert Finlay
- Production companies: Crick and Finlay
- Distributed by: Australian Photoplay Company
- Release date: 26 August 1911
- Running time: 3,000 feet
- Country: Australia
- Language: Silent film
- Budget: £300 or £500

The Assigned Servant, or the Life Story of a Deported Convict is a 1911 Australian silent film about a convict who is transported to Van Diemen's Land. It was made by the husband-and-wife team of John and Agnes Gavin and is considered a lost film.

== Plot ==
In England, Ralph Frawley is arrested for rabbit poaching and transported to Van Diemen's Land as a convict. He is assigned as a servant to a settler and falls in love with the daughter of the house. He marries her in secret but when this is revealed he is sent back to prison to serve the rest of his term. He escapes by a spectacular leap and swims to freedom. He turns to bushranging and robs the mail coach. He is saved by his aboriginal friend during a fight with police. After learning his wife has died he returns to England.

Chapter headings:

- The Great Poaching Scene
- Found Guilty
- 10 Years' Penal Servitude
- Bound for Van Diemen's Land
- The Assigned Servant
- The Secret Marriage
- Found Out
- An Aboriginal's Gratitude
- The Leap for Life
- Sensational Swim
- Down the Rapids
- A Madman's Revenge
- A Blighted Life
- Robbing the Royal Mail
- Sensational Climb by the Aboriginal
- England Once More

== Cast ==
- John Gavin
- Alf Scarlett
- Charles Woods as Geebung, Aboriginal character
- Dore Kurtz
- Sid Harrison
- Agnes Gavin
- Ethel Bashford
- May Kennard
- Charles Villiers
- Dapne Taylor
- Edie Taylor
- Billie Harcourt

== Production ==
Production still from the film

John and Agnes Gavin had made a series of successful films about bushrangers. Producers Stanley Crick and Herb Finlay agreed to finance a film with Gavin of which Assigned Servant was the first. Gavin wrote, it was to be:

A four-reel bush production, the scenario to be written by Mrs. Gavin, with myself as producer. Pathe was to find the film and the camera-man in addition to all the hiring and printing, my part of the agreement being to find actors and make the film, with three weeks as the limit for the complete production... We were only allowed 4,000 feet of negative with nothing for retake, as film was scarce in those days. We went to National Park for location. This was the first time moving pictures had been taken there, and the wonderful surroundings assisted a great deal."

Filming took under a month, which over a week spent on location. During the shoot, two actors injured themselves during a scene where they fought on top of a cliff and fell twenty feet below into the water. The actor Frank Gardiner cut his head falling from a horse during a chase scene, and an actor playing a trooper had four teeth knocked out during a fight.

Filming took place in the National Park, with Georges River heavily featured.

== Reception ==
According to Gavin the film was a big success, "the biggest winner of any Australian picture at the time." He said in another interview the film "was played on thirteen different occasions by Tom Howe and was alw'ays a good stand by whenever he was short of a picture."

In 1922 Tom Howe said the film "its original state it was a five-reeler. in my mind, this subject was a very fine one. I screened it on no less than thirteen different occasions, placing each time to capacity."

Gavin went on to make three more films for Crick and Finlay, Ben Hall, Frank Gardiner and Keane of Kalgoorlie. He said, "In those days showmen would come along and pay in advance for film before the story was even finished All you had to do was to let them know the approximate day or release, and the picture was booked and the cash paid. This advance money often paid more than the whole cost of the production."

=== Critical ===
The Sydney Truth called the film "a splendid example of the art of producing a photo-play... which embraces sensational doings in early Australian days. The gardens have been packed since it was produced, the audiences fully appreciating* the excellence of the work."
