= Herbert Finlay =

Australian photographer

Herbert Finlay was an Australian producer, photographer and exhibitor. He initially worked in films as a photographer and exhibitor of news items in Melbourne in the late 1890s. He helped tour The Story of the Kelly Gang (1907) and joined Pathe in 1910 to produce the Sydney edition of their newsreel. He went into producing with Stanley Crick and ran the camera department for the Australian Photo-Play Company. He was seriously injured in a film fire and became a travelling exhibitor.

He supported the existence of a film quota in Australia.

== Selected Credits ==
- Ben Hall and his Gang (1911) – producer, DOP
- Frank Gardiner, the King of the Road (1911) – producer
- The Assigned Servant (1911) – producer
- Keane of Kalgoorlie (1911) – producer
- The Life Story of John Lee, or The Man They Could Not Hang (1912) – producer
- Trooper O'Brien (1928) – producer
