= Stanley Crick =

Australian film producer and mayor

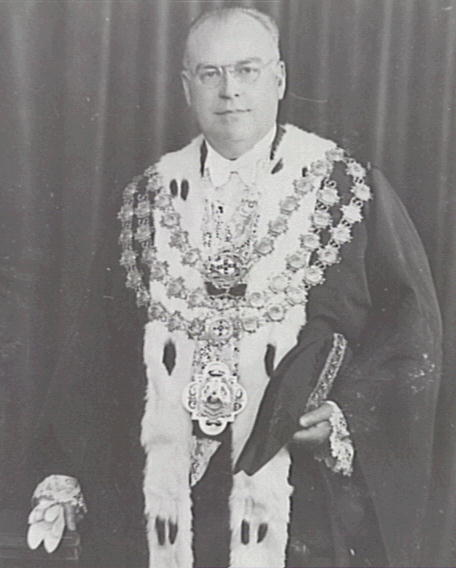
Alderman Stanley S. Crick (1935 - 1950) Lord Mayor of Sydney 1940 - 1942

Stanley Sadler Crick (9 October 1888 – 1955) was an Australian film producer, distributor and politician. He joined the Melbourne office of Pathe Freres and became manager of the Sydney branch in 1909. He went into production, first in partnership with Herbert Finlay then helping establish the Australian Photo-Play Company.

When that ended in 1912 he went into distribution as managing director of the express Film Service and in 1914 became partner of John C. Jones in another distribution service. He managed Fox Film Corporation's Australian operation from 1919 to 1938, during that time also serving as a chairman of director of Hoyts Theatres. He was an opponent of quotas for Australian films.

He worked as an alderman on the Sydney City Council from 1935 and served as Lord Mayor of Sydney from 1940 to 1942.

== Selected filmography ==
- Ben Hall and his Gang (1911) – producer
- Frank Gardiner, the King of the Road (1911) – producer
- The Assigned Servant (1911) – producer
- Keane of Kalgoorlie (1911) – producer

== See also ==
- Berith Park, Wahroonga
