= The Blue Mountains Mystery =

1921 film

- Everyone's 9 November 1921
- Directed by: Raymond Longford; Lottie Lyell
- Written by: Raymond Longford; Lottie Lyell
- Based on: The Mount Marunga Mystery by Harrison Owen
- Produced by: Dan Carroll; E. J. Carroll
- Starring: Marjorie Osborne; John Faulkner
- Cinematography: Arthur Higgins
- Edited by: Lottie Lyell
- Distributed by: Southern Cross Picture Productions
- Release date: 5 November 1921
- Running time: 6,000 feet
- Country: Australia
- Languages: Silent film English intertitles
- Budget: £3-4,000

The Blue Mountains Mystery is a lost 1921 Australian silent film directed by Raymond Longford and co-directed by Lottie Lyell.

It is considered a lost film.

== Plot ==
The Blue Mountains Mystery involves the alleged murder of a wealthy businessman, Henry Tracey, and the eventual discovery that the victim was an underworld look-alike impersonator. The main suspects are Tracey's ward, Pauline, Mrs Tracey, and Pauline's boyfriend, Hector, and his rival, Richard Maxim.

Eventually the supposedly dead Henry Tracey reappears and announces that he had been kidnapped. The corpse was Stephen Rodder, a man with a strong resemblance to Tracey.

== Cast ==
- Marjorie Osborne as Mrs Tracey
- John Faulkner as Henry Tracey/Stephen Rodder
- Vivian Edwards as Hector Blunt
- Bernice Vere as Pauline Tracey
- Billy Williams as Richard Maxim
- Redmond Barry as detective
- John de Lacey as Captain Banks
- Ivy Shilling as dancer
- Frederick Twitchin

== Production ==
Hotel guests including Billy Williams (left) and Majorie Osborne examine the supposedly dead Henry Tracey (John Faulkner)

The film was derived from the 1919 novel The Mount Marunga Mystery by Harrison Owen. E.J. Carroll bought the film rights in 1921. According to The Bulletin "Owen wasn’t at all extravagantly rewarded otherwise for his share of the work."

The movie was produced by the Carroll brothers, EJ and Dan, who had previously backed Longford's The Sentimental Bloke. It was Longford's third production for E. J. Carroll and the first in which Lyell received a formal co-direction credit. According to the book Australian Cinema: The First 80 Years by Graham Shirley and Brian Adams, the film cost almost double that of The Sentimental Bloke (1919).

Filming started in July 1921.

The movie was mostly filmed in Katoomba, the Blue Mountains and Sydney Harbour, with some studio work at the Carrolls' Palmerston studio in Sydney. The Carrington Hotel and Hydro-Majestic Hotel were featured. Shooting took an unusually long time to complete, in part because of the location work involved. Filming was completed by October.

The female lead was played by Marjorie Osborne, the only daughter of Charles Lord (son of Francis Lord) and Bertha Lord, née Kerr, later Mrs Emanuel de Beaupuis. She was a fashion consultant to the Sydney store of Farmer's, and wife of a wealthy land-owner, Henry Hill Osborne. She left her husband in December 1921 and unsuccessfully attempted a Hollywood career after making this film.

== Release ==
The film was debuted at the Lyceum Theatre in Sydney on 5 November 1921. It then screened through rural New South Wales before debuting in Melbourne on 26 December 1921.

== Reception ==
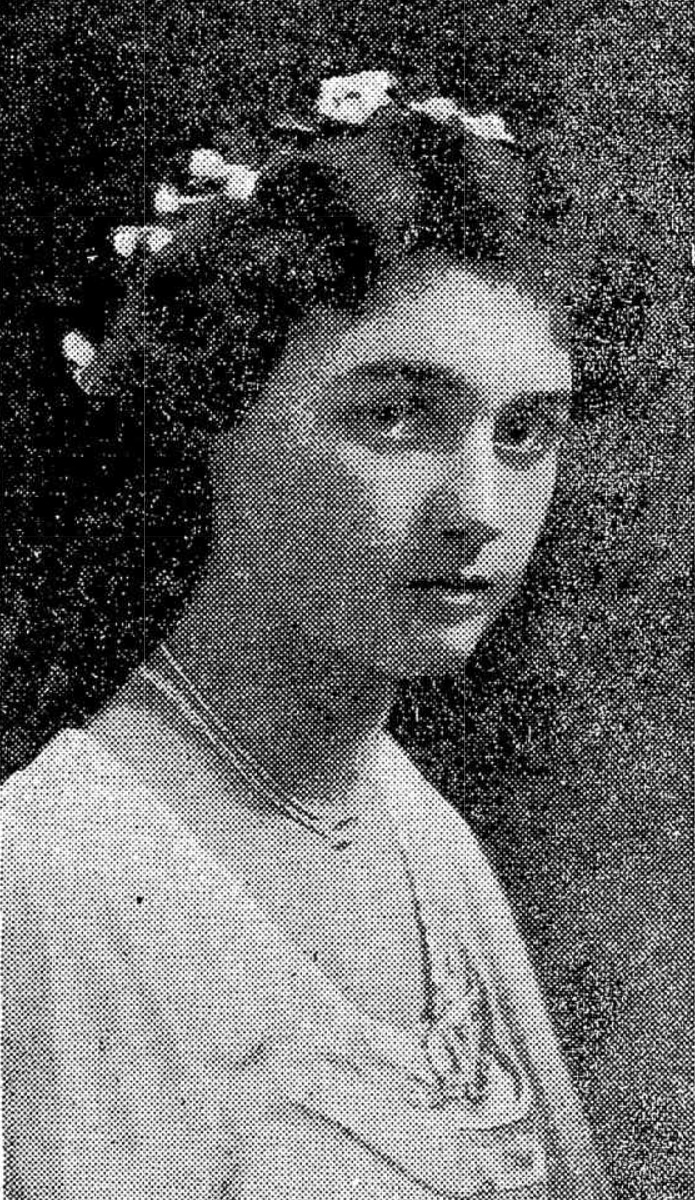
Marjorie Osborne, née Lord

The film was popular at the box office in Australia. In November 1921 Everyones reported the film "is playing to very big business all along the line, the patrons being more than satisfied with a picture that makes more than an Australian appeal."

Although now lost, at the time of its release The Blue Mountains Mystery fared well in the United Kingdom, South America and the United States upon its initial release.

The film reportedly was "appraised for exhibition purposes" at a value of £20,000 in the USA. According to The Bulletin "after a good run in this country it [the film] emigrated to U.S.A., and that land embraced it like a Little Brother. Then its promoters, the Carrolls, almost forgot about it until they got a cheque for a thousand-odd from London. John Bull says he likes it fine."

=== Critical reception ===
Sunday Times called it "finely directed and well acted. Marjorie Osborne... wears some beautiful gowns, importations from Paris and New York, and proves a surprise as an actress."

Everyones said:

This is an Australian production that should do a great deal towards giving our overseas relatives an idea of the scenic qualifications of this country when the subject of picture production is brought up. The story itself is somewhat melodramatic in construction here and there, but there is nothing unduly sensational, and the mystery is sufficiently enveloped in doubt to keep the audience guessing as to whom the original culprit is... the picture must have cost a great amount of money to produce. But it appears well worth it.

Triad called it an "uninteresting and disconnected" picture before stating, "Mr. Longford may be an excellent man when it comes to producing back-block studies and Woolloomooloo types; but he has not the vaguest beginning of an idea how to direct men and women in what is termed manners of society. His ideas of registering any sort of emotion are absolutely standardized."

Table Talk called it "a wonderful success".

The London Bioscope wrote of The Blue Mountains Mystery: " …by its restrained acting, shows the force which a story gains in the telling. As a consequence, suspense is held throughout". The reviewer of the Los Angeles Times said the film "will keep you on the edge of your seat to the last fade out."

Actress Marjorie Osborne was admiring of Lottie Lyell's contributions for The Blue Mountains Mystery. She said of her: "I like brains in a woman, and she has them. Her work on this picture is more on the directing side than the acting. She assists Mr. Longford, and the two of them have plenty of healthy argument when their ideas about a scene are different." The November 1921 edition of the Picture Show magazine also praised Lyell as being "enthusiastic, original, possessing charm and common sense" for her writing of the screenplay.

Harrison Owen was unimpressed with the film, which he thought poorly made compared to overseas movies.

Dan Carroll expressed satisfaction with the film and said he wanted to do another movie with Longford, Lyell and Arthur Tauchert in the vein of The Sentimental Bloke. However the Carrolls were frustrated with the financial returns they were receiving and withdrew from production after this film and concentrated on distribution and exhibition. Longford and Lyell formed their own company for what became The Dinkum Bloke.

== Resources ==
- Shirly, Graham; Adams, Brian (1983). Australian Cinema: The First 80 Years. Angus & Robertson Publishers. ISBN 0-207-14581-4.
- Harrison, Owen (1919). The Mount Marunga Mystery. Kessinger Publishing. ISBN 0-548-83250-1.
