= Arthur Higgins =

Australian cinematographer (1891–1963)

- Born: Arthur Embery Higgins; 25 October 1891; Hobart, Tasmania, Australia
- Died: 22 September 1963 (aged 71); Potts Point, Sydney, Australia
- Occupations: Cinematographer, director, photographer
- Years active: 1908–1945
- Spouse: Sheila Elizabeth Smith (m. 1917)

Arthur Embery Higgins (25 October 1891 – 22 September 1963) was a pioneering Australian cinematographer known for his use of trick photography during the silent era. His ongoing collaborations with director Raymond Longford include The Sentimental Bloke (1919) and The Blue Mountains Mystery (1921). He briefly turned to directing with Odds On (1928) however returned to cinematography in 1931 for the remainder of his career.

== Biography ==
Arthur Higgins was born in Glebe, Hobart, Tasmania in 1891. He was the youngest of three brothers, Ernest and Tasman. From a young age, Arthur was introduced to photography and projection by his eldest brother, Ernest. In 1900, Ernest rigged up a projector from his father's shop's balcony with a screen on a building across the street. Eventually Ernest's fascination with photography and cinema took him to Sydney where he found work at Cosens Spencer filming newsreels and travelogues. Although Arthur had begun a career in architecture, he chose to join Ernest in Sydney in 1908 to pursue a career in cinematography. From 1911, the brothers would work closely with director Raymond Longford. In 1912, Tasman also moved to Sydney to join his brothers.

=== Higgins Bros, Cinematographers ===
The Higgins brothers founded Higgins Bros, Cinematographers in 1913 after their workplace merged with Australasian Films Ltd. Generally the brothers worked on documentaries and compilation films although they did one feature film, A Long, Long Way to Tipperary in 1914. Discouraged by the lack of income from their work, by 1917 Ernest had become the sole proprietor of the company. After leaving Higgins Bros, Arthur ventured further with Raymond Longford and Lottie Lyell's projects including The Sentimental Bloke (1919) and On Our Selection (1920).

=== Arthur Higgins Productions ===
In 1928 Higgins set up Arthur Higgins Productions and made a racing film, Odds On, and in 1930, with his brother Tasman as cameraman, the visually spectacular Fellers. Set in Palestine, desert scenes were shot in sandhills near Sydney. Although mostly silent, the last reel was synchronized with a few minutes of dialogue. Fellers won the only prize in the Commonwealth Film Competition that year.

After visiting the United States of America, Higgins worked for F. W. Thring's Efftee Film Productions in Melbourne and later on films for Pat Hanna. In 1936, Higgins joined Cinesound Productions and continued to make feature films for different directors until 1946.

In the 1950s Higgins operated with Neville Bletcher the production company, Solarchrome Color Productions, at 300 Pitt st, Sydney, with studio at St Johns Road, Glebe NSW (1). Solarchrome was his own adaptation of a bi-pack (two tints) colour process.

Arthur married Sheila Elizabeth Smith on 27 June 1917 at Moonee Ponds, Melbourne. The couple were childless. Higgins died at his home at Potts Point, New South Wales on 22 September 1963 and was cremated.

== Filmography ==
- The Fatal Wedding (1911)
- The Romantic Story of Margaret Catchpole (1911)
- The Tide of Death (1912)
- Australia Calls (1913)
- If the Huns Came to Melbourne (1916)
- The Woman Suffers (1918)
- The Sentimental Bloke (1919)
- On Our Selection (1920)
- Rudd's New Selection (1921)
- The Blue Mountains Mystery (1921)
- Sunshine Sally (1922)
- A Daughter of Australia (1922)
- Circumstance (1922)
- Townies and Hayseeds (1923)
- Australia Calls (1923)
- Fisher's Ghost (1924)
- The Bushwhackers (1925)
- Peter Vernon's Silence (1926)
- The Pioneers (1926)
- Hills of Hate (1926)
- The Kid Stakes (1927)
- Odds On (1928) – director
- Fellers (1930) – director
- A Co-respondent's Course (1931)
- Diggers (1931)
- The Haunted Barn (1931)
- His Royal Highness (1932)
- Harmony Row (1933)
- Diggers in Blighty (1933)
- Waltzing Matilda (1933)
- The Streets of London (1934)
- Clara Gibbings (1934)
- A Ticket in Tatts (1934)
- The Avenger (1937)
- Show Business (1938)
- Wings of Destiny (1940)
- That Certain Something (1941)
- The Power and the Glory (1941)
- Harvest Gold (1945)
- A Son Is Born (1946)

== Notes ==
- Murray, Scott (1994). Australian Cinema. St.Leonards, NSW: Allen & Unwin/AFC. p. 325. ISBN 1-86373-311-6.
