= The Mount Marunga Mystery =

Book by Harrison Owen

- First Edition cover, 1919.
- Author: Harrison Owen
- Original title: The Mount Marunga Mystery
- Language: English
- Genre: Novella; Crime Fiction
- Publisher: Kessinger Publishing; N.S.W. Bookstall
- Publication date: 1919
- Publication place: Australia
- Media type: Print

The Mount Marunga Mystery is a murder mystery by Australian author Harrison Owen first published in 1919.

Owen, a Melbourne-based journalist, was noted by reviewers for his detailed knowledge of police procedures and skillful narrative construction. In June 2008, the novel was re-issued by Kessinger Publishing.

== Plot ==
The story unfolds at a Victorian mountain hotel during a fancy-dress ball, where wealthy pastoralist Henry Tracey is found murdered. Initial suspicions fall on Tracey's daughter and her lover, owing to the victim's opposition to their marriage. The daughter is eventually found guilty, leading to unexpected plot twists.

== Publication history ==
After the novel's initial publication by N.S.W. Bookstall in 1919 the book was reprinted by the same company in 1922.

== Adaptations ==
In 1921, Raymond Longford and Lottie Lyell adapted the novel into the silent film The Blue Mountains Mystery.

== Resources ==
- The Mount Marunga Mystery full text on archive.org
