= Fisher's Ghost (film) =

1924 film

- Everyone's 1 October 1924
- Directed by: Raymond Longford
- Written by: Raymond Longford; Lottie Lyell
- Produced by: Lottie Lyell; Charles Perry
- Cinematography: Arthur Higgins
- Production company: Longford-Lyell Productions
- Distributed by: Hoyts
- Release date: 4 October 1924
- Running time: 55 minutes (5000 feet)
- Country: Australia
- Languages: Silent film English intertitles
- Budget: £1,000

Fisher's Ghost is a 1924 Australian silent film directed by Raymond Longford based on the legend of Fisher's Ghost. It is considered a lost film.

== Synopsis ==
The film is set in 1820s New South Wales. Two transported convicts, George Worrall and Frederick Fisher, are released and take up farms at Campbelltown. They are both successful and become friends. Worrall persuades Fisher to go on a trip to England and says he will manage Fisher's farm. A few months later, Worrall goes to an estate agent with a letter from Fisher saying that he has decided to stay in England and has instructed Worrall to sell his farm.

In 1826, a settler called Farley sees an apparition who purports to be Fisher sitting on a three rail fence. This apparition claims he was murdered by Worrall and later indicates where Fisher's body lays. Worrall is arrested at his wedding to a girl who does not return his affections. He is tried, convicted and sentenced to death. He eventually confesses to the crime.

== Cast ==
- Robert Purdie as George Worrall
- Fred Twitcham as Frederick Fisher
- Lorraine Esmond as Nell Thompson
- Percy Walshe
- William Ryan
- Ted Ayr as Jim Mead, the love interest
- William Coulter
- Charles Keegan
- Ruby Dellew
- Ada St. Claire
- Charlotte Beaumont
- Ike Beck

== Production ==
Raymond Longford and Lottie Lyell, in association with Charles Perry, formed a new company together: Longford-Lyell Productions. Fisher's Ghost marks the production company's first film.

According to on contemporary account the film was shot on location in Campbelltown under the title The Life and Death of Frederick Fisher. Longford sought the advice of Campbelltown residents and also explored the records on the subject from the local Mitchell Library. Another report however says the film was shot on location entirely in Windsor, featuring such locations as the Fitzroy Hotel and the old courthouse.

The film was completed by August 1924.

Fisher's Ghost, The Bushwhackers (1925), and Peter Vernon's Silence (1925) were the only three films produced by Longford-Lyell Productions as the company had already entered liquidation in June 1924, even before the film's release.

Although Lottie Lyell and Raymond Longford created many films together, Fisher's Ghost and The Bushwhackers are the only films for which Lyell received credit as scriptwriter and assistant director before her death from tuberculosis in 1925.

== Reception ==
Everyones 24 May 1924

Reviews were strong as was public response.

According to Everyones the film "smashed all records on its initial screening at Hoyts, Sydney." It transferred to the Shell Theatre in Pitt Street, "and the very consistent sup-port given the picture since that day is further proof that its success... was no mere fluke. Fisher’s Ghost has a title that is worth a lot of money to the ex- hibitor. The story itself is a very satisfactory one, and the production, as a whole, will do much to create further interest in Australian-made motion pictures."

The film is attributed to being one of the earliest and influential Australian horror films, paving the way for the resurgence of the genre in the 1970s after the Australian government began funding their movie industry.

Union Theaters rejected the film be released in their Sydney theaters because their managing director, Stuart F. Doyle, claimed the film was "too gruesome" for the public. The film was shown in Hoyt theaters and yielded £1,300 in its first week of screenings.

The head of the actor's federation claimed the film was prejudiced against by sales agents.

In 1934 Longford registered a script for a remake of the film. However it was never made.

In 2010, Tony Buckley, a producer who helped find and restore the 1971 Australian film Wake in Fright, called for a Film Search program to locate the lost negatives of Fisher's Ghost as well as other historic Australian films.
