= Australia Calls =

Australia Calls may refer to:

- Australia Calls (1913 film), a 1913 Australian silent film directed by Raymond Longford
- Australia Calls (1923 film), a 1923 Australian silent film directed by Raymond Longford
