= The Swagman's Story =

- Directed by: Raymond Longford
- Written by: Violet Pettengel
- Starring: Lottie Lyell
- Cinematography: Tasman Higgins
- Production company: Commonwealth Film Producing Company
- Distributed by: Fraser Film Company
- Release date: 2 March 1914
- Running time: 2,000 feet
- Country: Australia
- Languages: Silent film; English intertitles

The Swagman's Story is a 1914 short film directed by Raymond Longford. Although considered a lost film, it is likely that it was a low-budget support feature.

Longford claimed the film was refused a release by "the Combine" who dominated Australian exhibition.

== Plot ==
A swagman arrives on the scene of the breakdown of a motor car and tells the honeymooning drivers that he's never liked motor cars as they've never done him any good. He then goes on to explain why – ten years earlier he was living happily with his wife and pretty daughter (Lottie Lyell). Then the daughter marries a "swell city cove" and she becomes a member of the high society set, refusing to meet her unsophisticated mother. The mother is killed by a motor car and the father takes to drinking and becomes a swagman.

== Cast ==
- Lottie Lyell
- J Martin
- C Stevenson
- G Corti
