= Tauchert =

Tauchert is a surname. Notable people with the surname include:

- Álvaro Tauchert Soler (born 1991), Spanish singer
- Arthur Tauchert (1877–1933), Australian acrobatic comedian, dancer, singer, and actor
