= The Dinkum Bloke =

1923 film

- Directed by: Raymond Longford; Lottie Lyell
- Written by: Raymond Longford; Lottie Lyell
- Produced by: Raymond Longford; Lottie Lyell
- Starring: Arthur Tauchert; Lottie Lyell
- Cinematography: Lacey Percival
- Production company: Longford-Lyell Australian Productions
- Distributed by: Paramount
- Release date: 2 June 1923
- Running time: 7,248 feet
- Country: Australia
- Languages: Silent film English intertitles
- Budget: £4,846 or £7,000
- Box office: £6,148 (Aust) £2,279 (UK)

The Dinkum Bloke is a 1923 Australian silent film directed by Raymond Longford. Despite the title and the presence of Arthur Tauchert and Lottie Lyell in the cast, the film is not a direct sequel to The Sentimental Bloke (1919) or Ginger Mick (1920).

It was known in the UK as A Gentleman in Mufti.

== Plot ==
Bill Garvin, a labourer on the Woolloomooloo wharf, is happily married to Nell and they have a little daughter, Peggy. When Bill breaks his leg, Nell has to go to work. She is a success, saving up money for her daughter, but falls ill after an operation and dies, making Bill promise that he will bring up Peggy a lady.

Bill puts his daughter in a convent school and sets about earning as much money for her as he can to pay the school fees, becoming a street singer in partnership with a musician who plays on street corners. Peggy grows up and stays with a wealthy school friend, Joy Gilder, at her family station in Queensland over the holidays. She falls in love with Joy's brother Geoffrey Gilden and they agree to be married.

A dinner party is held for Bill to meet his future in-laws but, despite buying a suit and reading a book on etiquette, he is not a social success and Peggy is embarrassed by him. She breaks off the engagement and returns to the convent.

Bill is upset by this but gets inspiration from a book he read to Peggy when he was little, The Prince and the Beggar Maid. He tells Geoffrey's parents that Peggy is not his real daughter – he adopted her after her real parents, respectable English people, died. The Gilders believe the story, Peggy marries Geoffrey, and Bill visits Nell's grave to tell her that her wishes have been carried out.

== Cast ==
- Arthur Tauchert as Bill Garvin
- Lottie Lyell as Nell Garvin
- Lotus Thompson as grown up Peggy Garvin
- Beryl Gow as 7 year old Peggy
- Jack Raymond as John Gilder
- Renee Sandeman as Mrs Gilder
- Cecil B Scott as Geoffrey Gilder
- Dorothy Date as Joy Gilder

== Production ==
The script was originally known as The Bloke from Woolloomooloo.

Raymond Longford and Lottie Lyell formed their own production company in May 1922 with a capital of £50,000."Advertising". Smith's Weekly. Vol. IV, no. 22. New South Wales, Australia. 22 July 1922. p. 23 – via National Library of Australia.

Longford used the studio of Australasian Films as well as their cameraman and laboratory. He paid Australasian a fee of £2,100, partly in the hope that Australasian would distribute – an opportunity they declined after the film's screening.

Filming began July 1922. Additional scenes were shot on location in Woolloomooloo and the Sydney CBD.

The story seems influenced by the 1920 novel Stella Dallas.

Table Talk later reported that during filming:

It became necessary to show the country home of the Gilders. The director (Raymond Longford) took the company to an old homestead outside Parramatta for the scenes in connection with this part of the story, but he was the only one who knew the exact place. When Rene Sandeman, who plays the part of Mrs. Gilder in the production, saw the house she was agreeably and genuinely surprised. It had at one time been her home, and she was able to show the company the beauty of the old home.

== Reception ==
The film secured distribution from a Hollywood studio, Paramount, not common for Australian films at the time, and was screened to the Australian Governor-General.

Reviews were strong and it earned £6,148 at the Australian box office of which £3,990 was returned to the producers.

A contemporary report claimed the film was sold to an English company for £900 who then earned £50,000 off it although Longford later put the amount the movie earned in England at £2,279.

The movie was released in the UK as A Gentleman in Mufti. However Longford's backers were unhappy with their returns and Longford-Lyell Australian Productions was put into liquidation by June 1924. It was replaced by Longford-Lyell Productions.
