= Gilbert Emery (Australian actor) =

Australian actor (1882–1934)

Gilbert Charles Warren Emery (1882 – 24 December 1934) was an Australian actor best known for his performances as Ginger Mick in the silent films The Sentimental Bloke (1919) and Ginger Mick (1920). These were directed by Raymond Longford with whom Emery had acted on stage in The Fatal Wedding.

Emery moved to Los Angeles in 1921 and stayed there for the rest of his life, teaching in an acting school. He died on the same day as actor friend Walter Cornock, who had played the role of the Bloke on stage.

== Select credits ==
- A Tale of the Australian Bush (1911)
- The Face at the Window (1919)
- Desert Gold (1919)
- The Sentimental Bloke (1919)
- Ginger Mick (1920)
- Rudd's New Selection (1921)
- While the Billy Boils (1921)
- The Lust for Gold (1921)
- A Rough Passage (1922)
- A Daughter of Australia (1922)
