= Trooper Campbell =

- Directed by: Raymond Longford
- Written by: Raymond Longford
- Based on: poem by Henry Lawson
- Starring: Lottie Lyell
- Cinematography: Higgins brothers
- Edited by: Higgins brothers
- Production company: Higgins-Longford Company
- Release date: 1914
- Running time: One reel (12 minutes)
- Country: Australia
- Languages: Silent film English intertitles

Trooper Campbell is a 1914 film from director Raymond Longford based on a poem by Henry Lawson.

The movie is one of Longford's more obscure works. There is some reference to it being made but none of it being released in cinemas.

The movie consisted of visual images to accompany an in-person recital of the poem.

It was considered a lost film but was discovered in the 1980s. Film writers Graham Shirley and Brian Adams stated that the film:

Shows an advance on The Romantic Story of Margaret Catchpole, not so much in performance, which is still haunted by melodrama, as in the use of depth of field and positioning within the frame... [It] appears to have been hurriedly made (it was never listed among Longford's major achievements) and displays nowhere near the polish of Alfred Rolfe's The Hero of the Dardanelles, completed halfway through the next year.
