= C. A. Jeffries =

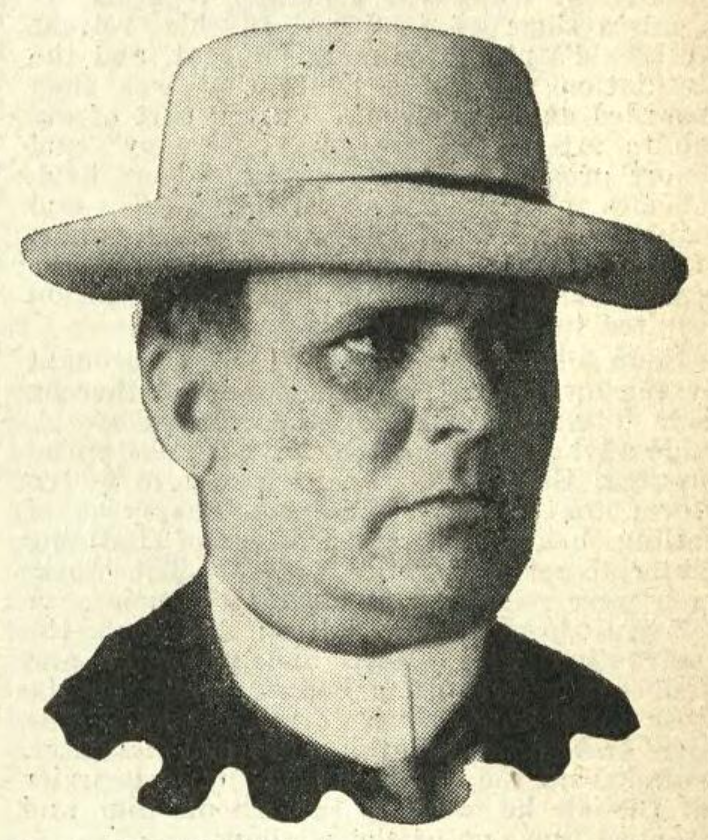
Charles Adams "Jeff" Jeffries

Charles Adams "Jeff" Jeffries (13 April 1869 – 17 April 1931) was an author and journalist in New Zealand and Australia.

== Biography ==
Jeffries was born in 1869 at Leigh Woods, near Bristol, England, and in 1878 was brought by his parents to New Zealand, where he helped his father manage a farm. He joined New Zealand Railways as a cadet telegraphist and later as surveyor.

He left New Zealand for Sydney in 1891, and after a few months working for the New South Wales Government took a position as journalist with The Bulletin, doubling as the editor's secretary, and gained a reputation as Australia's best writer on prize fighting.

He left The Bulletin in 1924 after some thirty years' service, and joined the Daily Commercial News and Shipping List as leader writer. His dedication to work was exemplified by his insistence of contributing to the paper, by dictation, in the last months of his life, when illness had him confined to bed. The paper published a number of "Letters to the Editor" in appreciation of his work. His remains were interred at the Waverley Cemetery.

=== Other interests ===
Jeffries was a serious amateur photographer, contributing articles to the Australasian Photo-Review.

== Publications ==
Jeffries by David Low

Famous Fights at the Stadium (1914) Platypus Press

He published a great number of short stories under the titles The Shepherd Kings of Canterbury and By Rail and Semaphore, which were never published as a collection.

Jeffries and fellow Bulletin journalist John Barr wrote the screenplay for Raymond Longford's epic 1913 film Australia Calls, now considered "lost".

== Family ==
Jeffries was married and had several daughters.
