= Augustus Neville =

Australian actor

Augustus Neville was a New Zealand-born actor who appeared in a number of the early films for director Raymond Longford but was best known for his stage career in Australia, particularly in works by William Shakespeare. He worked for many years with Alfred Dampier and Allan Wilkie.

== Selected Credits ==
- For the Term of His Natural Life (1908)
- Captain Starlight, or Gentleman of the Road (1911)
- The Romantic Story of Margaret Catchpole (1911)
- Sweet Nell of Old Drury (1911)
- The Tide of Death (1912)
- The Midnight Wedding (1912)
- The Murder of Captain Fryatt (1917)
- The Pioneers (1926)
