= Fisher's Ghost =

Fisher’s Ghost
- Written by: John Gordon
- Genre: operetta

Premiere
- Date: 29 September 1960
- Place: Sydney Teachers' College

Fisher's Ghost is a 1960 Australian operetta. It is based on the legend of Fisher's ghost which had previously inspired the 1924 film from Raymond Longford.

== Operetta ==
The operetta was composed by John Gordon and was originally performed at Sydney Teachers' College on 29 September 1960. It was revised for television.

Douglas Stewart wrote a play based on the same story which premiered shortly after the operetta.

=== Cast of 1960 production ===
- Ereach Riley
- Alan Light as George Worral
- Ross Whatson
- Pamela Coleman as Mrs Hurley
- Wilhelmina Bermingham as Miss Hurley

== 1963 TV adaptation ==
Fisher's Ghost
- Written by: John Gordon
- Starring: Ereach Riley
- Music by: John Gordon
- Country of origin: Australia
- Original language: English

Production
- Producer: Robert Allnut

Original release
- Release: 22 September 1963 (Sydney); 29 Sept 1963 (Melbourne)

The operetta was broadcast on the ABC. It was the first television opera with an Australian historical background.

=== Cast ===
- Ereach Riley as Birdlime the pickpocket
- Edmund Bohan as John Hurley
- Marilyn Richardson as John Hurley's sister
- Donald Philps as Fred Fisher

=== Reception ===
The Sydney Morning Herald thought the production had "musical merit" but had "serious" dramatic problems and needed to be revised.

== See also ==
- List of television plays broadcast on Australian Broadcasting Corporation (1960s)
