= Rudd's New Selection =

1921 film

- Directed by: Raymond Longford
- Written by: Raymond Longford
- Based on: stories by Steele Rudd
- Produced by: E. J. Carroll
- Starring: J. P. O'Neill; Tal Ordell; Lottie Lyell
- Cinematography: Arthur Higgins
- Edited by: Arthur Higgins
- Production company: Southern Cross Picture Productions
- Distributed by: E. J. Carroll; Dan Carroll
- Release date: 28 May 1921
- Running time: 6,000 feet
- Country: Australia
- Languages: Silent film English intertitles

Rudd's New Selection is a 1921 Australian silent film directed by Raymond Longford based on the Dad and Dave stories by Steele Rudd. It is a sequel to On Our Selection (1920). The plot concerns the marriage of Dave Rudd (Tal Ordell) and introduces a sister, Nell (Lottie Lyell).

Although popular on release, the movie is now considered lost.

== Synopsis ==
The movie is set eight years after the events of On Our Selection. The Rudd family are now more prosperous, but Dad is as autocratic as ever. His children are grown up and the baby twins are up to mischief Dave is married and tries to do as little work as possible, but is forced to do so by his wife and domineering mother.

Dave's sister Nell is pursued by the Regan brothers, the younger of whom, Jim, was a decorated returned soldier, the elder, Jack, a drunkard. The two brothers fight over Nell and Jack commits suicide. Jim is arrested for his murder but the truth comes out at the end and he and Nell are married.

There are other comic subplots, including one where Mr Dandelioon, a prohibitionist candidate for parliament, visits the Rudds and Joe laces his tea with rum.

== Cast ==
- J.P. O'Neill as Dad Rudd
- Ada Clyde as Mum
- Tal Ordell as Dave Rudd
- Lottie Lyell as Nell
- Charlotte Beaumont as Sarah
- Gilbert Emery as Mr Dandelion
- Louis Fors as Joe
- Billy Williams as Jack Regan
- Ernest T Hearn as Jim Regan
- Dick Varley as storekeeper
- Clyde Marsh as Trooper Brady
- May Renne as Lily
- William Coulter as Grogan
- Ada St Claire as Mrs Banks
- Meadow Peel as Matilda
- Anne Parsons as Mrs McFluster

== Production ==
Shooting began in late 1920 on location in the Megalong Valley, with interiors shot in the Carrolls' Studio at Waverly. The romantic male lead was Ernest Hearne, an ex-soldier from Queensland.

Rudall Hayward worked on the film as an assistant.

== Reception ==
Reviews were good.

=== Box Office ===
Steele Rudd later claimed the film earned £2345 in one cinema alone, from which the producers earned £519. This sort of return helped disillusion him with the film industry.

== See also ==
- List of lost films
