= Theodore Kremer =

American dramatist (1871–1923)

Theodore Kremer (1871–1923) was a German-born playwright whose works include The Fatal Wedding and a non-musical stage adaptation of Carmen.

Kremer's play An Actor’s Romance opened at the Camden Theatre on February 8,1904, starring Florence Nelson, and toured after that.
