= We'll Take Her Children in Amongst Our Own =

- Directed by: Raymond Longford
- Based on: poem by Victor Hugo
- Produced by: Archie Fraser; Colin Fraser
- Starring: Lottie Lyell
- Production company: Fraser Film Release and Photographic Company
- Release date: 1 February 1915
- Country: Australia
- Languages: Silent film English intertitles

We'll Take Her Children in Amongst Our Own was a 1915 film directed by Raymond Longford based on a narrative poem by Victor Hugo. It was called "an Australian picture poem."

The film was released in support of The Sunny South or The Whirlwind of Fate along with a "boxing burlesque" called The Unknown.

It is considered a lost film.

== Premise ==
According to advertising, "the famous poem by Victor Hugo, with its strong and touching human story, has been specially dramatised for this film. The extremely difficult feat, never before accomplished, of synchronising the rhythm of the poem with the movement of the drama has been accomplished. Extraordinary beauty, with powerful heart stopping effect."

For some presentations the poem was presented by Lottie Lyell.
