= Southern Cross Feature Film Company =

Australian film production company

Southern Cross Feature Film Company was a short lived film production company that made some of Australia's most famous silent films, mostly directed by Raymond Longford. One of the key figures behind it was Sir David Gordon.

== History ==
The company was incorporated in Adelaide in 1917 and announced they would make five dramas and three comedies over the next 12 months. Another report said they hoped to make "six or eight five reelers" over twelve months. One hundred shares were offered at £1 a share. Their first picture was to be The Black Opal but this does not seem to have been made.

They offered cash for Australian stories.

According to Raymond Longford, they initially secured the serves of American director, Mr Walter May Plank, but he left Australia and Longford was called in instead. Their first feature was the successful The Woman Suffers (1918). which was followed by The Sentimental Bloke. In 1920 the company paid out a dividend of a shilling per share.

The company was a subscriber to Carroll-Baker Australian Productions, which made movies starring Snowy Baker, and had a five-twelfths interest in Southern Cross Picture Productions. Southern Cross Picture Productions Ltd was incorporated in 1920 with a value of £37,600 and directors including E. J. Carroll, Snowy Baker and D. Gordon.

The company was at its peak in 1921 with the successful release of The Sentimental Bloke and Ginger Mick.

In 1923 there was a trial involving a man who falsely pretended to be from the company to abduct a young woman.

In 1925, E. J. Carroll suggested the company make a film adaptation of C. J. Dennis's The Rose of Spadgers at £1,000-£2,000 but after consideration the company directors elected not to do this. By that stage the company was reporting consistent losses, due in part to its inability to recoup costs incurred in Great Britain and the US. It appears to have wound up shortly afterwards.

== Select filmography ==
- The Woman Suffers (1918)
- Algie's Romance (1918) – facilities provided only
- The Sentimental Bloke (1919)
- Ginger Mick (1920)
- The Jackeroo of Coolabong (1920) – a Southern Cross Picture Production
- Rudd's New Selection (1921) – a Southern Cross Picture Production
- The Blue Mountains Mystery (1921) – a Southern Cross Picture Production
