= The Pioneers (1926 film) =

1926 film

- Everyones 8 June 1926
- Directed by: Raymond Longford
- Written by: Lottie Lyell
- Based on: novel by Katharine Susannah Prichard
- Produced by: Raymond Longford
- Starring: William Thornton; Virginia Beresford
- Cinematography: Arthur Higgins
- Edited by: Raymond Longford; Arthur Higgins; Mona Donaldson (uncredited)
- Production companies: Australasian Films; A Master Picture
- Distributed by: Union Theatres
- Release date: 5 June 1926 (Sydney)
- Running time: 8,000 feet (approx two hours)
- Country: Australia
- Languages: Silent film English intertitles

The Pioneers is a 1926 Australian silent film directed by Raymond Longford. The script had been written by Lottie Lyell but she had died by the time filming started. It was considered a lost film but some surviving footage from it has recently emerged.

== Synopsis ==
The story of a Scottish settler and his wife, Donald and Mary Cameron, who live in the Gippsland bush, with their son David. They adopt the daughter of an ex-convict and raise him as their own. The daughter and David Cameron fall in love, but she marries another man.

== Cast ==
- Virginia Beresford
- William Thornton as David Cameron
- Robert Purdie as Donald Cameron
- Connie Martyn as Mary Cameron
- Augustus Neville
- George Chalmers
- W. Dummitt
- 'Big' Bill Wilson
- Sydney Hackett
- Phyllis Culbert

== Production ==
Katharine Susannah Prichard's novel had won a £1,000 prize in 1915 and had previously been filmed by Franklyn Barrett in 1916.

It was directed by Raymond Longford who in September 1925 had accepted a position of director of productions at Australasian Films. He worked on several films for them but the association ended badly. The director complained that this and Hills of Hate were forced on him by Australasian Pictures, elaborating, "Both these books were selected by the directors of the combine; they were produced at an inadequate expense and in many cases the cast was chosen despite my protests. During the filming of these pictures I recognised that these pictures were absurdly cheap and inadequate to secure even an English market."

Filming took place on location near Gosford and at Australasian's studios in Bondi Junction in early 1926. During the shooting of one sequence, William Thornton was thrown from his horse and was seriously injured. Because they were so far from a town, first aid was performed by Longford himself, who had had medical training. Longford sewed four stitches into Thornton's head.

== Reception ==
The critic for the Sydney Morning Herald wrote that:

Raymond Longford's latest Australian production... is a distinct advance on his last picture, "The Bushwhackers". Its photography and settings are equal to the best American, and a vein of natural sincerity runs right through its acting. The story, too, is more definite. In fact, from the state of having practically no story at all, Mr. Longford has run to the other extreme and tried to bring in too much story, so that after one has been looking at the picture for nearly two hours new issues are still coming in, which would need still another half hour for their adequate solution... Mr. Longford himself seems to have realised that his spectators' patience must be at an end here; for he has suddenly brought the play to a close and left all sorts of important things unexplained... If only The Pioneers could be wound up about half-way or two-thirds of the way through, so as to obviate all this trite melodrama, which has been put in obviously as a sap to the populace, it would stand as a landmark In the history of Australian motion pictures.

According to Everyones:

However well this story may read... it entirely fails to grip the interest on the screen. Starting quite auspiciously with a settler and his wife pioneering their way out into the wilds, it nevertheless peters out after the first reel. The producer has endeavored to cram too much into the story with the result that one skips the passing of years with a rapidity that baffles... At the end one is left in doubt as to the meaning of it all... picture does not come up to the standard of previous local productions. It may be classed as a programme picture which will appeal on sentimental grounds only.

Table Talk said the film "presents a vivid story of the old Colonial days in Victoria."

== Proposed remake ==
In 1932 Cinesound Productions announced plans to make a sound version of the novel but no film resulted.
