= Rawdon Blandford =

New Zealand born stage and screen actor (1891–1961)

- Born: Arthur Rawdon Blandford; 30 November 1891; Dunedin, Otago, New Zealand
- Died: 29 September 1961 (aged 69); Perth, Western Australia
- Occupation: Actor

Rawdon Blandford (1891–1961) was a New Zealand born stage and screen actor.

== Filmography ==
- A Maori Maid's Love (1916)
- The Breaking of the Drought (1920)
- The Bushwhackers (1925)
- Painted Daughters (1925)
- Peter Vernon's Silence (1926)

== Personal ==
Blandford was born in Dunedin, Otago, New Zealand to George and Annie Jane Blandford in 1891. He died in Perth, Western Australia in 1961.
