= 'Neath Austral Skies =

1913 Australian film by Raymond Longford

- Directed by: Raymond Longford
- Written by: Raymond Longford
- Produced by: A.C. Tinsdale
- Starring: Lottie Lyell
- Production company: Commonwealth Film Producing Company.
- Distributed by: Co-Operative Film Exchange
- Release date: 2 December 1913
- Country: Australia
- Languages: Silent film English intertitles

'Neath Austral Skies is a 1913 Australian silent film directed by Raymond Longford.

It is considered a lost film.

It is referred to as 'Neath Australian Skies in newspapers of the day.

== Plot ==
Captain Frank Hollis is engaged to Eileen Delmont. When her brother Eric commits a theft, Frank accepts the blame in order to protect her family's name. He leaves for Australia and joins the New South Wales mounted police. Eric confesses and Eileen and her father go to Australia to track down Frank. They buy a property, some of their cattle is stolen and request a trooper come to their aid – it is Frank. On the way out to see them, Frank is captured by the thieves and is thrown in the river, but Eileen comes to his aid and the lovers are reunited.

== Cast ==
- Lottie Lyell as Eileen Delmont
- Robert Henry as Colonel Delmont
- George Parke as Eric Delmont
- Martyn Keith as Captain Frank Hollis
- Charles Villers as Gidgee Dan
- Mervyn Barrington as "Snowy", boundary rider
- Walter Warr as Ah Lum, cook
- T Archer as Monaro Jack

== Production ==
'Neath Australian Skies was the name of a popular collection of poetry from E.B. Loughran published in 1894.

The film was not widely screened and is not one of Longford's better known movies.

The film opens in Surrey, England and then changes scene to feature Australian station-life. Mounted troopers and bushrangers also feature in the picture, adding to the drama.

It was reported to have some "splendid views of Sydney and of the Australian bush".

== Reception ==
The film was shown at the Melbourne Lyric Theatre in 1913.

One contemporary critic said the film "has many exciting and sensational scenes, relieved with pure Australian comedy to hold the audience. The photography is very true." The Argus wrote about one screening being "well received."

Raymond Longford's name was used extensively in advertising and was described in 1914 as "a great Australian picture production, claimed to be the greatest of all Australian photo-plays." He claimed the film was refused a release by "The Combine".
