= The Tide of Death =

- Directed by: Raymond Longford
- Written by: Raymond Longford
- Based on: an original story by Raymond Longford
- Produced by: Cosens Spencer
- Starring: Lottie Lyell
- Cinematography: Tasman Higgins; Arthur Higgins
- Edited by: Tasman Higgins
- Production company: Spencer's Pictures
- Release date: 13 April 1912 (Sydney)
- Running time: over 3,000 feet
- Country: Australia
- Languages: Silent film; English intertitles

The Tide of Death is a 1912 Australian silent film directed by Raymond Longford based on an original story by Longford. This was rare at the time because most Australian silent films were based on plays or novels.

It is considered a lost film.

== Synopsis ==
The film is set in Australia's past. It opens with a young mining contractor, Philip Maxwell, blowing up a rock at a mining site. He then rides on horseback to the bank to get wages for his crew. "The Lizard", a camp loafer, learns about this and informs Black Dan Bryce, who decides to rob Philip with his gang. This is overheard by Dan's step daughter Sylvia, who rides for help.

The saddle bag containing the money is secured by one of Dan's gang, who is overpowered by Philip. He manages to conceal the money just before he is captured by Dan and refuses to say where it is. The gang suspect Sylvia of being an informant and knock her down; she recovers in time to see Philip being taken away, then finds Philip's horse and rides for help.

Dan tries to get Philip to talk by tying him to a stake in the middle of a rising tidal creek, while Sylvia manages to alert Philip's mining crew. The water is rising to Philip's chin when Sylvia arrives on horseback, dashes into the creek, stems the tide and cuts Philip free.

Two years later Philip and Sylvia are married and have a baby, Edna, when Philip gets an urgent telegram from home. While he is away, their house is burgled by Dan and his old gang, who recognise Sylvia and kidnap her to get revenge. They take her away to a hut and make her their servant.

Unable to find any trace of his wife, Philip thinks she has left him, so he sells his property and goes abroad with Edna. Black Dan's gang argue amongst themselves, causing a fire at the hut, enabling Sylvia to escape. When she returns home, she finds her house abandoned and Philip and her child gone. She goes to a convent where the sisters nurse her through an illness. She later becomes an assistant teacher at Spencerville Private School.

Three years later Philip and Edna return to Australia. Edna loses a trinket, which one of the school children find and return to Sylvia. She advertises it and Edna's nurse draws Philip's attention to it. He and Edna visit the school and are reunited with Sylvia.

== Cast ==
- Lottie Lyell as Sylvia Grey
- Augustus Neville as Philip Maxwell
- Frank Harcourt as Black Dan Bryce
- Bert Harvey as Dan gang member
- DL Dalziel as Dan gang member
- D Sweeney as Dan gang member
- G Flinn as bushman
- Fred Twitcham as bushman
- Arthur Steel as bushman
- Joe Hamilton as Mat Davis
- Lois Cumming as Jenny
- Little Annie Gentile as Little Edna
- Arno the horse

== Production ==
The film was shot in and around Sydney using many of the cast who had appeared in Longford's earlier movies.

Advertising said the film was "an original picture suggested and worked on by one of Spencer's staff, played by artists of their own selection, and photographed by their own operators, who have acquired a reputation for turning out the best cinematograph work in the commonwealth."

== Reception ==
=== Box office ===
The film was well received by critics and the public, screening throughout Australia and reportedly attracting good crowds.

=== Critical ===
The Bulletin film critic said:

The scenes are local and easily recognisable, and the plot is spread over a good deal of ground, including a good picture of the departure of an Orient boat from the Quay... The acting and mountings show an improvement on the previous pictures; plainly the Spencer co. means to hold its own with Yankee and European.

The Sydney Morning Herald said the film was "not wanting in either dramatic strength or love interest. The principal sensations are the blasting explosion, the hero being gradually drowned by the rising tide, and a big fire scene. Many beautiful Australian scenic settings have been introduced."

The Perth Daily News said it was "worthy to rank with the best productions of the leading American or European firms."

However the critic from the Perth Sunday Times thought the movie should have ended where the hero was rescued from the flood:

Instead of which, probably having a lot more inoffensive celluloid left, Spencer extended the drama to maudlin limits and completely spoiled the story. Likewise the photography in the latter part was of decidedly an amateurish calibre, and completely out of harmony with the first portion. It seems to this print as if the original photographer had grown weary of his work and had gone home and left his understudy to do the fag end of the fake.
