= Ginger Mick =

1920 film

- Directed by: Raymond Longford
- Written by: Raymond Longford; Lottie Lyell
- Based on: The Moods of Ginger Mick and Doreen by C. J. Dennis
- Produced by: E. J. Carroll
- Starring: Gilbert Emery
- Cinematography: Arthur Higgins
- Production company: Southern Cross Feature Film Company
- Distributed by: E. J. & Dan Carroll (Australia)
- Release date: 2 February 1920
- Running time: 5,500 feet
- Country: Australia
- Languages: Silent film English intertitles

Ginger Mick is a 1920 Australian silent film directed by Raymond Longford based on The Moods of Ginger Mick by C. J. Dennis, which had sold over 70,000 copies. It is a sequel to The Sentimental Bloke (1919) and is considered a lost film.

== Plot ==
The adventures of Ginger Mick take him from slums and backyards to lock-ups and racecourses. He romances Rose, works as a rabbitoh and enlists to fight in World War I. He writes letters back to his old friend, the Bloke now married to Doreen with a young son, Bill. Mick makes friends with a fellow soldier, Keith, and is eventually killed at Gallipoli on the hills of Sari Bair.

== Cast ==
- Gilbert Emery as Ginger Mick
- Arthur Tauchert as the Bloke
- Lottie Lyell as Doreen
- Queenie Cross
- Jack Tauchert as Bill

== Production ==
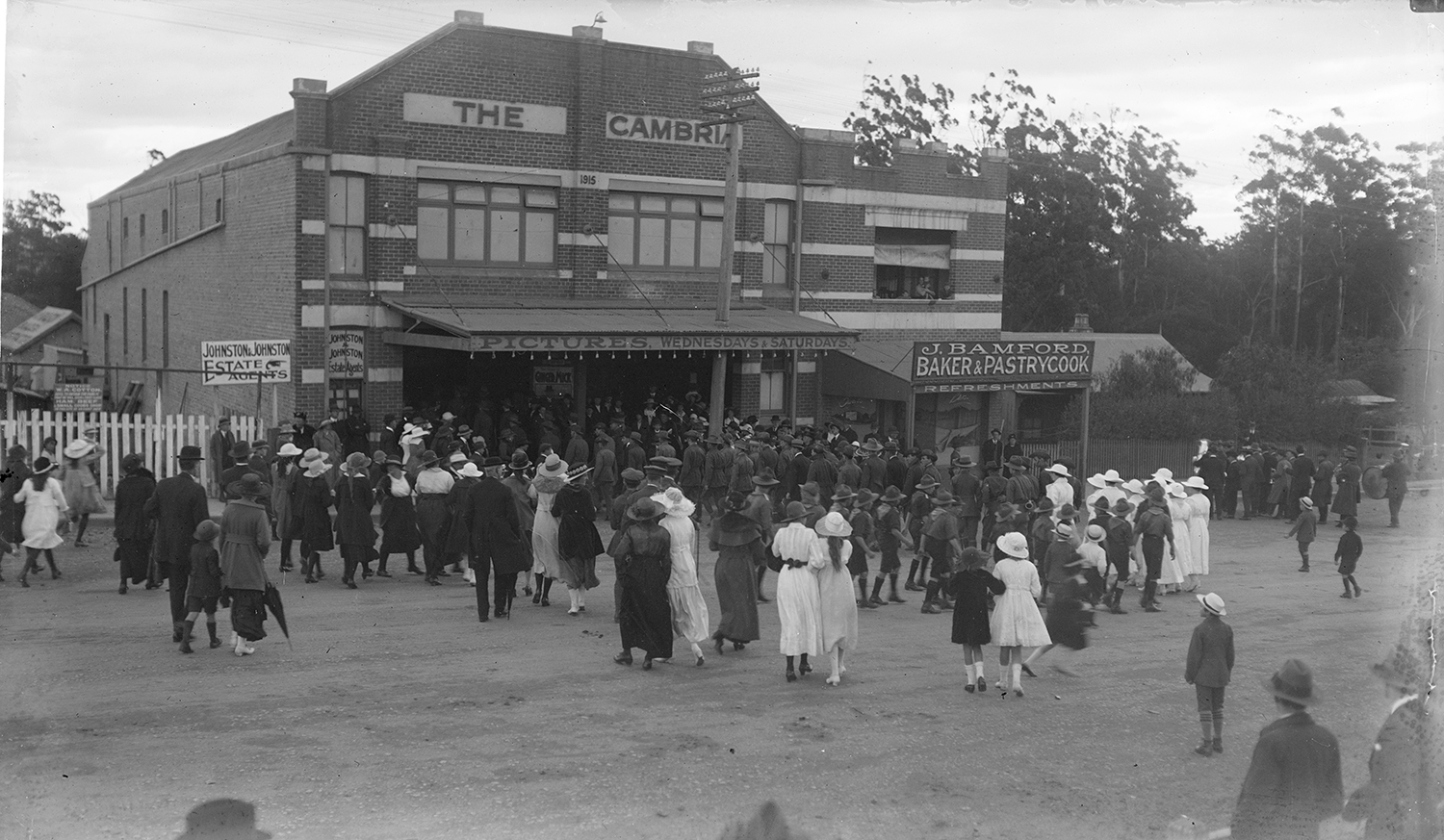
Soldiers entering The Cambria cinema, to see Ginger Mick movie, High Street [Beecroft Road], Epping, Sydney, 1920

E. J. Carroll wanted a sequel to The Sentimental Bloke so Longford came up with the idea of combining two poems by C. J. Dennis, The Moods of Ginger Mick and Doreen.

In August 1919 it was announced Dennis had given permission to make a sequrl.

According to a later account in Everyone's there was a humorous incident during filming "the famous "duck and fowl" scene, in which Ginger wrecks the Chinese restaurant where the "straw-hat coot" is eating." The article described:

At nine o’clock about two dozen Chinese arrived, accompanied by half a dozen real policemen off duty—the latter counterfieiting the real thing in the film. Every thing was ready when "props" discovered that he had forgotten the ducks. A halt was called, while messenges scoured the city for ducks—not an easy, job on a Saturday, with the markets closed. The problem was what to do with the "Chows" in the interim. The actors entertained themselves, but the Celestials seemed nervous, and likely to beat a retreat any minute. They were hastily herded into the projection room, and an ancient film run through for their edification. Twice and three times the operator put it through, and still no ducks. Someone suggested running it back wards as most of the "Chinks" announced their intention of going home. However they were persuaded to stay. And the hours dragged on. Finally, about half past one, a perspiring property man arrived with the feathered actors, and all was well. The scene was set, the actors took their places and the director called for his Chinese atmosphere. They filed into the studio one by one. The heat was terrific, the afternoon sun blazing down on the one glass side. They took a look round, and with a unanimous grunt of "Too ho!” they filed out. Double pay was the only inducement by which they could be persuaded to continue their work.

== Release ==
The film was popular at the box office and generally well reviewed. It was released in Britain.

The critic to The Sydney Morning Herald said that:

The selection of types, incidents and environment... has been highly intelligent; so that one gets not only a complete idea of the author's story, but apt material presentments of the sort of people of whom Mr. Dennis writes, besides glimpses of the rough haunts and byways where the "fraternity" flourish. Mr. Gilbert W. Emery, who is cast as "Ginger Mick", has quite obviously made a painstaking study of his part, and has succeeded in embodying as many of the bizarre indigenous elements peculiar to that uncommon Australian city type."

Table Talk called the film:

A triumph in the art of natural production, and promises to make an even greater appeal to picture-goers than its famous predecessor. Apart from the natural acting of Gilbert Warren-Emery... there are several unrehearsed incidents in the film, one being a "dinkum scrap" between two kiddies who were striving for front places during the taking of a street scene. The "Bloke" and "Doreen" figure largely in the film, and Arthur Tauchert and Lottie Lyell are as big a hit as ever in these parts.
