= The Midnight Wedding =

- Still from the film
- Directed by: Raymond Longford
- Written by: Raymond Longford
- Based on: play by Walter Howard
- Produced by: Cosens Spencer
- Starring: Lottie Lyell
- Cinematography: Ernest Higgins
- Edited by: Ernest Higgins
- Production company: Spencer's Pictures
- Release date: 7 December 1912
- Running time: 3,500 feet
- Country: Australia
- Languages: Silent film; English intertitles

The Midnight Wedding is a 1912 Australian silent film directed by Raymond Longford based on a popular Ruritanian stage play of the same name by Walter Howard in which Longford had appeared. It is considered a lost film.

It should not be confused with a 1912 film from the Gaumont Company of the same name.

== Plot ==
In the fictitious European country of Savonia, the dashing Paul Valmar enlists in the Hussars after the death of his mother. After five years of service he is becomes a lieutenant and is appointed sword master to the regiment, causing jealousy amongst others, notably the young Prince Eugene von Strelsburg and the wealthy Captain von Scarsbruck. Von Scarsbruck has been rejected by Eugene's sister, the Princess Astrea, and he gets Eugene involved in gambling. Eugene taunts Valmar about his parentage, resulting in a fight in which Eugene is injured. Valmar seeks refuge in a church.

Under the terms of her father's will, the Princess Astrea must marry, but is given the option of von Scarsbruck or a nunnery. Father Gerard conceives of the idea of uniting Valmar with the princess. He blindfolds the officer and marries him to her on midnight. Valmar is subsequently captured and brought towards the Crown Prince. Valmar informs him that he is the Crown Prince's own son.

Von Scarsbruck is still intent on forcing a marriage with Astrea by destroying her reputation. He visits her chamber late one night, and is discovered by Valmar who challenges him to a duel. Valmar is injured, and Astrea confesses to her brother that she is married to him. Valmar recovers from his wounds and fights another duel with Von Scarsbruck. During the fight the cowardly Eugene tries to strike up Valmar's sword and Valmar runs him through. Astrea succeeds in stopping the fight, then the Crown Prince intervenes and puts Eugene and von Scarsbruck under arrest, banning all women from officer's quarters. Astrea disguises herself as an officer and sneaks into see the injured Valmar. She is discovered by the Crown Prince and confesses she is married to him.

Three months later, Valmar has recovered from his wounds and duels von Scarsburck again. Astrea hears about this and rides to the duel just in time to see Valmar mortally wound his opponent. Valmar and Astrea marry again, this time in a large ceremony.

== Cast ==
Cast (in alphabetical order)

- J. Barry as Rev. A. Cette
- D. L. Dalziel as Capt. Rudolph von Scarsbruck
- Jack Goodall as Father Gerard
- Robert Henry as Maj. Donelli
- Tim Howard as Cpl Otto
- Dorothy Judge as Kathie
- Nellie Kemberman as Stephanie
- Tom Leonard as Pvt. Bobo
- Victor Loydell as Sgt. Max
- Lottie Lyell as Princess Astrea
- Augustus Neville as Paul Valmar
- George Parke as Lt. Prince Eugene
- Harry Saville as innkeeper
- Arthur Smith as Dr Eitel
- Fred Twitcham as Crown Prince of Savonia

== Original Play ==
The Midnight Wedding
- Poster from a 1907 Australian production
- Original language: English
- Written by: Walter Howard
- Genre: melodrama

The play had was first performed in Australia in 1906 and was enormously popular. Longford had appeared in it playing the role of Von Scarsbruck although he did not act in the film. The cast largely came from the stage production produced by Clarke and Clyde Meynell.

== Production ==
The movie was the first to be shot at Cosens Spencer's new studio at Rushcutters Bay in Sydney, enabling it to feature elaborate sets.

A duel sequence shot outside a Sydney church was one of the first duels ever put on film.

== Release ==
The movie is sometimes confused with a British film of the same name that was released in Australia around the same time. It received good reviews and was a popular success at the box office.
