= On Our Selection (1920 film) =

1920 film

- Directed by: Raymond Longford
- Written by: Raymond Longford; Lottie Lyell; Syd Nicholls (titles)
- Based on: stories by Steele Rudd
- Produced by: E. J. Carroll
- Starring: Percy Walshe; Tal Ordell
- Cinematography: Arthur Higgins
- Production company: E.J Carroll
- Release date: 24 July 1920
- Running time: 6,890 feet
- Country: Australia
- Languages: Silent film English intertitles

On Our Selection is a 1920 Australian silent film directed by Raymond Longford based on the Dad and Dave stories by Steele Rudd.

== Plot ==
Mrs Rudd and the younger of her six children go and join Dad Rudd and his son Dave on the family's selection, where Dad and Dave have built a slab and mud hut. The family adjusts to bush life and eventually make enough to buy a horse and plough. The farm progresses until set back by a year-long drought and bushfire.

Later, the eldest Rudd daughter, Kate, returns from teaching in the city. She romances neighbour Sandy Nelson, and they get married.

== Cast ==
- Percy Walshe as Dad Rudd
- Tal Ordell as Dave Rudd
- Beatrice Esmond as Mrs Rudd
- Arthur Greenaway as Sandy Taylor
- Evelyn Johnson as Kate
- Fred Coleman as Dan
- Charlotte Beaumont as Sarah
- Arthur Wilson as Joe
- Olga Willard-Turton (credited as Olga Willard) as Nell
- Nellie Bisellas Mrs Anderson
- Carmen Coleman as Lily White
- David Edelsten as parson

== Production ==
Producer E. J. Carroll bought the rights to Rudd's stories for £500. He originally wanted American director Wilfred Lucas to make the film, but he refused as he felt the subject matter was too intrinsically Australian.

Carroll did not have the rights to Bert Bailey's play adaptation of the stories, so the script comes directly from Steele Rudd's original works. This means it does not feature additions made by the play, such subplots involving murder and a love triangle.

Longford cast many non professional actors in support roles to give the film more authenticity. The actor who played Cranky Jack was discovered at Circular Quay.

Longford later said:

The true art of acting is not to act and that’s what I have dinned into the ears of my characters, and I think it has had its effect in the natural ness of my pictures. If I am producing Australian stuff, I want it to be Australian, and the average Australian is a casual carelessly natural beggar... In my opinion, the stage production sacrificed all that was human and appealing, in attempting to be dramatic. It is the little things that count, the little human touches that build up a big production, and to these I have driven the most thought... No stage atmosphere for me, nothing artificial I like realism, and I think I get it.

Filming took place in June 1920.

Longford's regular collaborator Lottie Lyell was ill during the making of the film and thus had little to do with its production. The movie was mostly shot on location in Baulkham Hills near Sydney with outdoor scenes, including the bushfire, shot at Leeton.

The film was far less broad than most rural comedies of the time.

== Reception ==
The film was successful at the box office and was followed by a sequel, Rudd's New Selection (1921).
