= If the Huns Came to Melbourne =

- Directed by: George Coates
- Cinematography: Arthur Higgins
- Production company: Advance Film Corporations
- Release date: 29 May 1916
- Running time: 3 reels
- Country: Australia
- Languages: Silent film English intertitles

If the Huns Came to Melbourne is a 1916 Australian silent film directed by George Coates. A World War I propaganda tale, it is considered a lost film. It was not widely shown and was made with a low budget.

== Production ==
Interior scenes were shot in an open air at Albert Park in Melbourne.

== Release ==
Advertising for the film stated that:

Imagine, if you can, the nameless horrors perpetuated on helpless Belgians in the name of German Kulture! Think for a moment on a repetition of the dreadful nightmare in Melbourne. Picture those nearest and dearest to you at the mercy of the Huns! This is what the producers have set out to do in this remarkable picture.

The film was screened privately for Australia's then Minister for Defence, Senator George Pearce.
