= Fisher's ghost =

Popular Australian ghost story dating to the early 19th century

The legend of Fisher's ghost is a popular Australian ghost story or folk tale dating to the early 19th century. It arose from a series of historical events which occurred in Campbelltown, New South Wales, now a large urban population centre on the southwestern outskirts of Sydney, but at the time a remote rural outpost. Inspired by the legend, the Festival of Fisher's Ghost has been celebrated in Campbelltown since 1956. A 1924 Australian silent film titled Fisher's Ghost retells the events of the legend.

== The legend ==
On 17 June 1826 an English-born Australian farmer from Campbelltown named Frederick Fisher (born 28 August 1792 in London) suddenly disappeared. His friend and neighbour George Worrall claimed that Fisher had returned to his native England, and that before departing had given him power of attorney over his property and general affairs. Later, Worrall claimed that Fisher had written to him to advise that he was not intending to return to Australia, and giving his farm to Worrall.

Four months after Fisher's disappearance a respectable local man named John Farley, ran into the local hotel in a very agitated state. He told the astonished patrons that he had seen the ghost of Fred Fisher sitting on the rail of a nearby bridge. Farley related that the ghost had not spoken, but had merely pointed to a paddock beyond the creek, before disappearing.

Initially Farley's tale was dismissed, but the circumstances surrounding Fisher's disappearance eventually aroused sufficient suspicion that a police search of the paddock to which the ghost had pointed was undertaken - during which the remains of the murdered Fisher were discovered buried by the side of a creek. George Worrall was arrested for the crime, confessed, and subsequently hanged. Fred Fisher, whose lands he had coveted, was buried in the cemetery at St. Peter's Anglican Church in Campbelltown.

It has been suggested that Farley invented the ghost story as a way of concealing some other speculated source of his knowledge about the whereabouts of Fisher's body, but this cannot be confirmed. Joe Nickell has written the ghost story may have originated from an anonymous poem in 1832 which fictionalised Fisher and Worrall. The poem, "The Sprite of the Creek!", has since been identified as the work of James Riley (1795-ca.1860), who would republish it with explanatory footnotes in 1846 under the pseudonym "Felix".

Contemporary police and court records do not mention the ghost story. The legend of Fisher's ghost has since entered popular folklore and the creek beside which the body was discovered is known as Fisher's Ghost Creek, although it has now, however, been converted into mostly a storm water drain.

== The festival ==
The Festival of Fisher's Ghost dates back to 1956 and is organised by Campbelltown City Council, NSW, Australia. It utilises the legend of Fisher's Ghost, to promote community togetherness and the varied activities of a diverse population in an array of creative forms. It is promoted as an energetic, lively and colourful celebration of Campbelltown City's history and its people.

The annual ten-day festival is celebrated in Campbelltown, every November. It includes a parade through Queen Street (Campbelltown's main street), Fisher's Ghost Art Award, Fun Run, Street Fair, Carnival, Craft Exhibition, music, competitions, open days, children's events, fireworks and the Miss Princess Quest.

== See also ==
- Fisher's Ghost - opera
- List of festivals in Australia
