= Odds On (film) =

1928 film

- Directed by: Arthur Higgins
- Written by: Arthur Higgins; Austin Fay (titles)
- Produced by: Arthur Higgins
- Starring: Arthur Tauchert; John Faulkner
- Cinematography: Arthur Higgins; Tasman Higgins
- Edited by: Arthur Higgins; Sheila Moore
- Production company: Arthur Higgins Productions
- Distributed by: Australasian Films
- Release date: 6 October 1928
- Running time: 6,300 feet
- Country: Australia
- Languages: Silent film English intertitles
- Budget: £2,000

Odds On is a 1928 Australian silent film starring Arthur Tauchert set in the world of horse racing. It was the first film as director by noted cinematographer Arthur Higgins.

It is considered a lost film.

== Plot ==
Sydney Baxter, a jockey, tries to shield a friend by allowing himself to be suspended for six months for improper riding. He joins up with racecourse urger Grafter Jones and sets of to tour country race meetings. Baxter goes to work in the stables of a family friend, John Grayson, and falls in love with his daughter, Betty. Grayson gives Baxter the chance to ride his horse, Brigade, in a local derby and Baxter is victorious.

== Cast ==
- Arthur Tauchert as Grafter Jones
- Phyllis Gibbs as Betty Grayson
- Check Hayes as Sydney Baxter
- Stella Southern
- Stanley Court
- Robert Purdie
- John Faulkner
- Violet Elliot as the cook
- W.H. McLachlan
- Gayne Threlkeld

== Production ==
The female lead, Phyllis Gibbs, had been under contract to Cecil B. de Mille in Hollywood.

The movie was shot in June 1928 on location at Randwick racecourse and in Australasian Films' Bondi studio. A number of well known race horses and jockeys appear.

== Release ==
Everyone's said the film was the most popular Australian movie of 1928 and made a profit.

The movie obtained a release in the UK as a quota picture.
