= Taking his Chance =

- Directed by: Raymond Longford
- Written by: Raymond Longford
- Based on: Poem by Henry Lawson
- Starring: Lottie Lyell
- Cinematography: Higgins brothers
- Production company: Higgins-Longford Films
- Release date: 1914
- Country: Australia
- Languages: Silent film English intertitles

Taking his Chance is a 1914 film from director Raymond Longford based on a poem by Henry Lawson. It was one of two short films Longford made from poems by Lawson, the other being Trooper Campbell.

It is considered a lost film.
