= Australia Calls (1923 film) =

1923 film

- Directed by: Raymond Longford
- Written by: Lottie Lyell
- Starring: Ernest Idiens
- Cinematography: Arthur Higgins
- Production companies: Commonwealth Immigration Office; British Empire Exhibition Commission
- Release dates: 24 November 1923 (Sydney); 1924 (England)
- Running time: 45 minutes
- Country: Australia
- Languages: Silent film English intertitles
- Budget: £1,500

Australia Calls is a 1923 Australian silent film directed by Raymond Longford commissioned by the Australian government to be shown at the British Empire Exhibition in Wembley Park, London, in 1924.

It was a semi-documentary about the adventures of Ernest Idiens, a labourer from Longnor Staffordshire who moved to New South Wales with his brother in 1912 with only £30 between them and by 1923 had assets worth £14,000. In 1923 Idiens toured England talking about his success.

The movie is not to be confused with Longford's 1913 picture Australia Calls and is considered a lost film.

== Production ==
The Australian government originally commissioned Longford to make four films depicting Australian society, each running 4,000 feet and costing £1,500. However bad weather caused a delay in shooting and Longford only made two, this and An Australian By Marriage. The other two movies were shot by the official government cinematographer, Bert Ive.

Shooting began in March 1923 in the country town of Harden, New South Wales and the film was completed by June, six weeks behind schedule. An Australian by Marriage was completed immediately afterwards but very little is known about it.

The other two films were completed by November, when they were all shown to leading members of the government.

== Reception ==
The reviewer from The Register praised the film saying "Seldom has the screen given a more striking demonstration of its power to tell a convincing story."

The Farmers Advocate said the film is "rather Utopian in that the immigrant's 11 years of life in Australia is just one round of success upon success, and it would appear that the lives of immigrants in Australia are "Roses — roses all the way." No fires or droughts are shown, and it is made to appear that the only thing necessary is hard work and plenty of it."

Everyones said "The photography... is exceptionally good, and the scenes embodied in the story are far ahead of anything previously seen. The picture should have been made four or five years ago, for those exhibited in London to encourage immigration, during the period the writer was in London, were a disgrace to the Commonwealth, besides being very misleading."
