= Tasman Higgins =

Australian cinematographer (1888–1953)

- Born: Tasman George Higgins; 8 April 1888; Glebe, Hobart, Tasmania, Australia
- Died: 4 June 1953 (aged 65); Parramatta, Sydney, New South Wales, Australia
- Occupation: Cinematographer
- Years active: 1912–1944
- Spouse: Gladys Mary Walker (m. 1915–1953) (his death)

Tasman Higgins (8 April 1888 – 4 June 1953) was an Australian cinematographer during the early days of the Australian film industry, working for such directors as Charles Chauvel, Raymond Longford, Beaumont Smith, Louise Lovely and Rupert Kathner. He was the brother of Arthur and Ernest Higgins, with whom he occasionally collaborated.

His most notable association was with Charles Chauvel, starting with In the Wake of the Bounty (1933), which was Errol Flynn's first film and involved three months of location filming on Pitcairn Island. Other credits include Heritage (1935), Uncivilised (1936) and the cavalry scenes of Forty Thousand Horsemen (1940).

== Select filmography ==
- The Tide of Death (1912)
- Australia Calls (1913)
- The Silence of Dean Maitland (1914)
- A Coo-ee from Home (1918)
- The Hordern Mystery (1920)
- The Life Story of John Lee, or The Man They Could Not Hang (1920)
- When the Kellys Were Out (1922)
- Daughter of the East (1924)
- Jewelled Nights (1925)
- Environment (1927)
- The Rushing Tide (1927)
- Caught in the Net (1928)
- Odds On (1928)
- Fellers (1930)
- The Hayseeds (1933)
- In the Wake of the Bounty (1933)
- When the Kellys Rode (1934)
- Heritage (1935)
- Uncivilised (1936)
- The Avenger (1937)
- Below the Surface (1938)
- Forty Thousand Horsemen (1940)
- Racing Luck (1941)
