= The Fatal Wedding =

1911 film by Raymond Longford

- Poster from early Australian production of play
- Original language: English
- Written by: Theodore Kremer
- Genre: melodrama

Premiere
- Date: 1901

The Fatal Wedding is a play by Theodore Kremer and a 1911 Australian silent film directed by Raymond Longford based on the melodrama, which he and Lottie Lyell toured around Australia. It was Longford's debut feature as director and one of the most popular Australian movies of its day. It is considered a lost film.

== Original play ==
Theodore Kremer's play appeared on Broadway in 1901 and was popular in England, the US and Australia.

Mary Pickford appeared in productions of the play early in her career.

Kremer later wrote a companion play in 1902, For Her Children's Sake.

The play was the subject of an unsuccessful plagiarism action.

== Synopsis ==
An adventuress, Cora Williams is in love with Howard Wilson, even though he is happily married to Mabel, and they have small children. Cora gets a man called Curtis to pretend to be in love with Mabel and engineers a situation where Howard walks in on them and gets the wrong impression. It works, Howard divorces Mabel and gets custody of their children Jessie and Frankie. Mabel winds up abducting them.

Five years later Cora discovers Mabel living in poverty with the children. She tries to poison Mabel and frame Jessie on a charge of theft but is unsuccessful. Howard and Mabel eventually reconcile and live with their children.

== Film ==
The Fatal Wedding
- Still from the film
- Written by: Raymond Longford; Lottie Lyell
- Based on: play by Theodore Kremer novel by R. M. Clay
- Produced by: Cosens Spencer
- Starring: Raymond Longford; Lottie Lyell
- Cinematography: Arthur Higgins
- Edited by: Arthur Higgins
- Production company: Spencer's Pictures
- Distributed by: Spencer's Pictures
- Release date: 24 April 1911
- Running time: 3,500 feet
- Country: Australia
- Languages: Silent film English intertitles
- Budget: £360 or £600 (Longford estimate) or £4,000
- Box office: £18,000 (est.) or £16,000

=== Cast ===
- Lottie Lyell as Mabel Wilson
- Raymond Longford as Howard Wilson
- Walter Vincent as Robert Curtis
- Tom Cosgrove as Toto
- Henry Saville as Peter Schwartz
- George Ellis as Constable O'Reilly
- Mr Henderson as Reverend Dr Lanceford
- Miss Clare as Cora Williams
- Helen Fergus as Bridget
- Elsie Rennie as Jessie
- Master Anson as Frankie

=== Production ===
Although Longford had appeared in several films as an actor and helped make a documentary about the Burns–Johnson fight in 1908, this was his first feature as director. It was also Lottie Lyell's first movie.

Longford and Lyell had acted in the play when it toured around Australia under the management of entrepreneur Philip Lytton.

=== Shooting ===
Various figures have been given for the budget - the earliest report said it was more than £500. Higgins said £2,000

Shooting took place largely in an artist's studio in Bondi with a roof taken off and six-foot reflectors used to improve the lighting. Longford claimed it was the "first interior picture taken in Australia."

=== Differences from the play ===
According to contemporary reviews, the one departure from the stage show was the introduction of a motor car in the scene which shows little Jessie (Elsie Rennie) leaving Paradise Alley with a bodyguard of poor children.

Another reviewer said the ending was changed; the play finished in the church but Longford "introduces for a finish the restoration of Mabel to her husband and family amidst the glow of glorious Australian scenery."

The famous scene from the play involving the Tin Can Band was recreated. When the film was screened a real band played behind the screen.

=== Reception ===
Advertising claimed the film would "inaugurate a new era in motion photography". It was previewed on 21 April 1911.

=== Critical ===
The Sydney Morning Herald wrote that

The acting throughout is of a very high standard and all the great features and powerful scenes of the drama are most vividly and clearly portrayed. The film itself is unusually good the objectionable flicker being reduced to a minimum and all the figures and background standing out with great clearness and definition. The "Tin Can Band" is here wonderfully pictured, the Little Mother is all the time excellent and the adult characters are seen to great advantage throughout.

The critic from the Sydney Sunday Times said that:

Although the play is American, Mr. C. Spencer is justified in presenting the [movie]... as an example of Australian art. Everything about the play in its new form is Australian. A company which was formed in Sydney acted the melodrama for Mr. Spencer's operators, and one may recognise Bondi in the outdoor scenes – notably in the episode of the cliff house and the escape of the little heroine... After a cinematograph series of 'Australian Bushrangers,' it is a relief to see bright-faced and happy-hearted children representing the better, even if the poorer, side of life in this part of the world... Jessie, the little mother' with the Tin Can Band of youngsters, made The Fatal Wedding a success when it was first played here at the Criterion Theatre. And it is the kiddies who make the success of Mr. Spencer's reproduction under the direction of Mr. R. H. Longford. In the 'children's party' scene of the third act one song is cleverly counterfeited by a child behind the screen and 'hidden noises' lend an air of realism when the juvenile band shouts with joy or rattles the tin cans. To make up for the absence of songs at this point there is a good deal more dancing than one saw in the play itself.

The Perth Sunday Times said that " The lady who plays the she-villain... is without doubt the woodenest dolt that ever spoilt good celluloid."

The Bulletin said the film "has been a howling success, just as it was in its drama form, and the measure of that success is a scathing commentary on the artistic taste of Sydney public — unless the Sydney public applauded it merely as a photographic masterpiece." The same magazine later said "the thing is spectacular, and some of the situations have thrills in them, while the drivel of the "book" is unheard. The result is that the picture-goer gets his money's worth, while the old theatre-goer got too much... the choice of light does the stripling [Higgins] credit."

=== Box office ===
The Fatal Wedding was a big success at the box office in Sydney – the Governor General even attended a screening. It then played Melbourne and the rest of Australia and was very popular, launching the cinema careers of Longford and Lyell, as well as enabling producer Cosens Spencer to establish a film studio at Rushcutter's Bay in Sydney.

It was still screening in cinemas in 1914.

Spencer sold the Queensland rights to E. J. Carroll for £5,000.

Spencer reportedly made £5,000 from it. In 1922 Longford claimed the film made a profit of £16,000.

=== Historical significance ===
Longford later claimed the movie was the first domestic drama picture using interiors made in Australia.

Some have also argued this film was the first to introduce the close up. Arthur Higgins backed this claim in the 1960s, saying it was he who suggested it. He said he was taking the usual long shot when he mentioned to Longford, "Ray, I think we'll move in closer for this shot."

=== Other versions ===
The play was filmed in 1914 by Biograph Studios in the US.

In November 1922 Longford announced he would remake the film but this did not happen.

In 1933 Cinesound Productions announced plans to make a sound version of the play but this did not eventuate.
