= Australia Calls (1913 film) =

1913 film by Raymond Longford

- Directed by: Raymond Longford
- Written by: John Barr; C. A. Jeffries
- Produced by: Cosens Spencer
- Starring: Lottie Lyell
- Cinematography: Arthur Higgins; Tasman Higgins; Ernest Higgins
- Edited by: Ernest Higgins
- Production company: Spencer's Pictures
- Release date: 19 July 1913
- Running time: 45 minutes
- Country: Australia
- Languages: Silent film English intertitles

Australia Calls is a 1913 Australian silent film directed by Raymond Longford about the fictitious invasion of Australia by an unnamed Asian country.

The movie is not to be confused with Longford's 1923 picture Australia Calls, which is considered a lost film.

Longford later claimed the film was the first Australian movie to have mass extras (from Sydney's Chinatown) and feature model photography, as well as being the first film in the world to show wireless communication. Film historians have said "the scale and blatant propaganda of [the film]... made it the least typical of Longford's thirty narrative films".

== Plot ==
The film begins with a prologue, 'The Warning', showing a Sydney horse race, then a football match in front of thousands of spectators. Living on an outback station, Beatrice Evans (Lottie Lyell) rejects the advances of a suitor. An unnamed Asian country lands 20,000 troops (called "Mongolians") on the New South Wales coast, and Australia issues a call to arms, mobilising its forces. The invading army attacks Sydney, setting buildings on fire and taking over the Mint, Treasury Building and wireless telegraph station. The rejected suitor turns traitor and Beatrice is captured by the enemy. However she is rescued by plane with the help of aviator William E. Hart and the Australians are victorious.

A contemporary review said "the synopsis contains scenes of Australians at play, at the races, at football, the call to arms, the burning of Sydney, the enemy in possession, Australian mobilising, the capture of the wireless station, treachery, in the hands of the enemy, Australian bushmen rallying, tapping the overhead telegraph wires, the charge of the lancers, and ride for life, William E. Hart (Australia's aviator) to the rescue."

== Cast ==
- Lottie Lyell as Beatrice Evans
- Frank Phillips as Evans
- Alfred O'Shea
- George Wilkins
- William Ewart Hart as aviator
- Andrew Warr as Asian commander

== Production ==
The movie was written by John Barr and C. A. Jeffries, two journalists from the magazine The Bulletin, and sought to exploit Australia's fear of the Yellow Peril. Filming was done with the assistance of the Australian Defence Department and took over a year to complete, including model work to depict the burning of Sydney.

The cast includes early Australian aviator William Ewart Hart, who made the first cross-country flight in New South Wales, and later tenor Alfred O'Shea. Ernest Higgins shot some aerial photography for the film on a flight with Hart. Scenes involving Hart were shot at Richmond.

An article in Everyone's later wrote that in the film, Longford's "attacking forces for obvious reasons were Celestials, and he commandeered the staff of a Chinese cabinet maker whilst engaged on the war scenes." Hostilities were taking longer than anticipated, and the cabinet maker, in despair, at length said: "Waffor this war no finish. No good for business, me wantum carpenters." One warrior fell sick, and had to be replaced. The interpreter calmly walked over to a nearby market garden and pressganged one of the gardeners at work there. "All same Chinese," he said, "no matter he like it or not, make him finish."

== See also ==
- Yellow Peril
- Invasion literature
