= An Australian by Marriage =

1923 film by Raymond Longford

- Directed by: Raymond Longford
- Starring: Lottie Lyell
- Cinematography: Bert Ive
- Release date: 1923
- Country: Australia
- Language: Silent film

An Australian by Marriage is a 1923 Australian dramatized documentary directed by Raymond Longford. It was commissioned by the Australian government for the British Empire Exhibition in Wembley Park, London, in 1924, to serve as propaganda for attracting migrants to Australia.

== Plot ==
Isabelle (Lottie Lyell) emigrates from England to Australia after getting engaged to an Australian carpenter. Isabelle is met by the Y.W.C.A. on arrival and secures a position as a nursemaid. She and herfiancébuild a home. They obtain a baby bonus.

== Cast ==
- Lottie Lyell as Isabelle

== Reception ==
The film was screened at the Majestic Theatre in Canberra on 7 August 1923 in front of a crowd that included the Governor General and Acting Prime Minister Earl Page.

One newspaper review commented; "the picture is well produced and acted in a bright manner, and should, indeed, be a great incentive for young people to migrate to the Commonwealth." However, a reviewer for Smith's Weekly was less enthusiastic.
