= The Woman Suffers =

- Directed by: Raymond Longford
- Written by: Lottie Lyell or Raymond Longford
- Starring: Lottie Lyell
- Cinematography: Arthur Higgins
- Production company: Southern Cross Feature Film Company
- Release date: 23 March 1918 (Adelaide)
- Running time: 61 mins (8,000 feet)
- Country: Australia
- Languages: Silent film; English intertitles

The Woman Suffers is a 1918 Australian silent film directed by Raymond Longford. It is a melodrama starring Lottie Lyell. Two-thirds of the movie still survives.

== Plot ==
The movie consists of eight acts.

In Echuca, a woman, Marion Masters (Connie Martyn) is unhappily married to Philip, a former war hero turned abusive drunk. She runs away from her husband with her baby son. Her husband falls on a knife and dies, their home is destroyed in a fire and she collapses in the bush. By the time she is rescued her son has been found by another family who run the station "Kooringa".

Marion is taken to a station "Willaroon" owned by widowed Stephen Manton (Charles H Francis), who has two children, Ralph and Marjory. Marion believes her son perished in the bush. She marries Manton and becomes stepmother to his children.

Her missing son grows up as Philip Stockdale (Brian Lawrence as a child, Boyd Irwin as a man), the adopted child of the owners of Kooringa Station, who already have a daughter Joan.

Twelve years later, Ralph Manton (Roland Conway) is sent to Melbourne by his father, but a flooded river forces him to take refuge at the Stockdale's station, where he seduces Joan (Evelyn Black). He goes to Melbourne and lives a playboy lifestyle, and Joan drowns herself in despair. Her brother Philip (Boyd Irwin) finds the body and vows revenge on Ralph.

He decides to seduce Ralph's sister, Marjory (Lottie Lyell) and abandons her after she becomes pregnant. She becomes mad and tries to abort her baby. Ralph discovers this and vows revenge on Philip – but is shamed when he discovers Philip's identity. Mrs Manton tells Philip the whole story and realises he is her long-lost son. Philip decides to marry Marjory.

== Cast ==
- Lottie Lyell as Marjory
- Evelyn Black as Joan Stockdale
- Roland Conway as Ralph Manton
- Charles H Francis as Stephen Manton
- Ida Gresham as Mrs Stockdale
- Boyd Irwin as Philip Stockdale
- Connie Martyn as Marion Masters
- CR Stanford as John Stockdale
- Herbert Walsh as Rev. Mr. Payne
- Harry Beaumont as swagman
- Guy Hastings as clergyman
- Brian Lawrance as Little Phillip

== Production ==
The movie was the first film from the Southern Cross Feature Film Company, who hired Raymond Longford to direct. It was shot in South Australia in late 1917 and early 1918.

== Release ==
The premiere of The Woman Suffers was held at the Theatre Royal in Adelaide on 23 March 1918, and earned an excellent review in The Advertiser.

It was also in other states. However, after running for seven weeks in New South Wales, it was banned by the NSW censor on 22 October 1918. No reason was ever given despite pleas from Longford and questions put to the Chief Secretary in the Legislative Assembly.

In Adelaide, Southern Cross Features ran a competition for best opinion on the questions "Was Ralph Manton guilty of murder?" and was "Philip Masters justified?" with a prize of £2 for "the best opinion ventured."
