= Peter Vernon's Silence =

1926 film

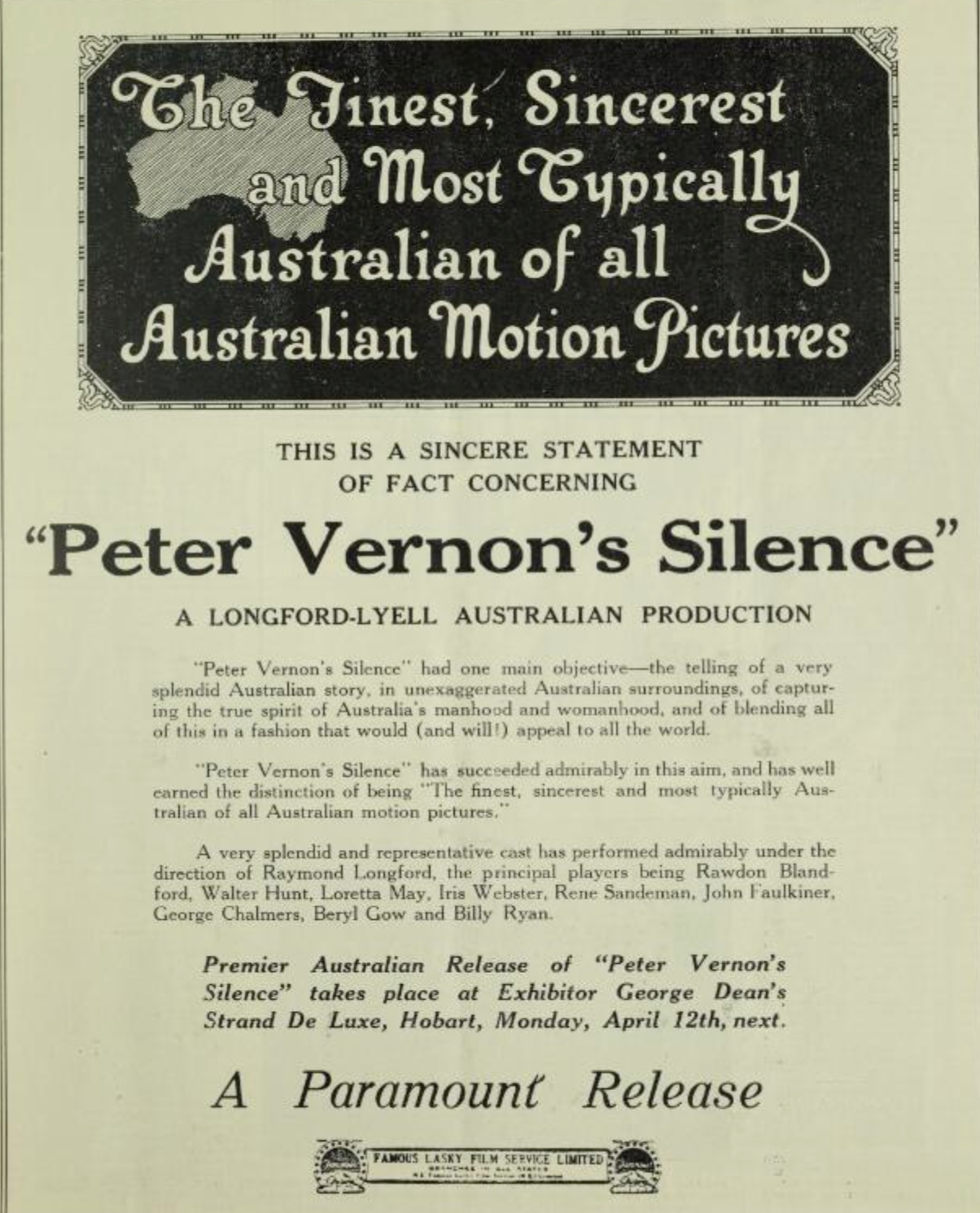
- Everyone's 31 March 1926
- Directed by: Raymond Longford
- Written by: Raymond Longford; Lottie Lyell
- Produced by: Raymond Longford
- Cinematography: Arthur Higgins
- Production company: Longford-Lyell Productions
- Distributed by: Paramount
- Release date: 17 April 1926
- Running time: 5,830 feet
- Country: Australia
- Languages: Silent film English intertitles
- Box office: £1,114

Peter Vernon's Silence is a 1926 Australian silent film directed by Raymond Longford. It was the last film on which Lottie Lyell worked prior to her death in December 1925. It is considered a lost film.

== Plot ==
Peter Vernon's mother dies and he is adopted by a squatter, Kingston, whose son, Philip, is Peter's age. The two grow up and fall in love with the same girl, Marie. Marie loves Philip but her father forbids the marriage because of his dark reputation and Philip kills the old man in a fit of rage.

Peter tries to take the blame by fleeing from the police and is chased through the Snowy Mountains before being caught. He is sent to gaol, and when he gets out Philip confesses to the murder on his death bed. Peter is reunited with Marie.

== Cast ==
- Rawdon Blandford as Peter Vernon
- Walter Hunt as Philip Kingston
- Loretta May as Marie
- Rene Sandeman
- Iris Webster
- Beryl Gow
- John Faulkner

== Production ==
The movie was the last production from Longford-Lyell Productions which had made Dinkum Bloke, Fisher's Ghost and The Bushwhackers.

The film featured location shooting in and around Moss Vale, Mount Kosciuszko, Kiandra, Adaminaby, Leura and the Blue Mountains.

== Release ==
The Herald 19 April 1926

In February 1926 it was announced Paramount, which had distribututed Longford's Dinkum Bloke, had acquired rights to the film. The contract was signed 15 February which required Paramount to use its "best efforts to release the film not later than" 1 April. The film was received on 28 February but not released in Victoria until 17 April. It was not released in New South Wales until October.

== Reception ==
=== Critical ===
Everyones said the film was "chiefly remarkable for some very excellent photography" but "the story is very weak and unconvincing."

The Herald said the cast "should have been better".

=== Box office ===
Despite being distributed by Paramount, Longford said the film only earned £1,114 at the Australian box office of which £724 was returned to the producers.
