= Lottie Lyell =

Australian actress and film director (1890–1925)

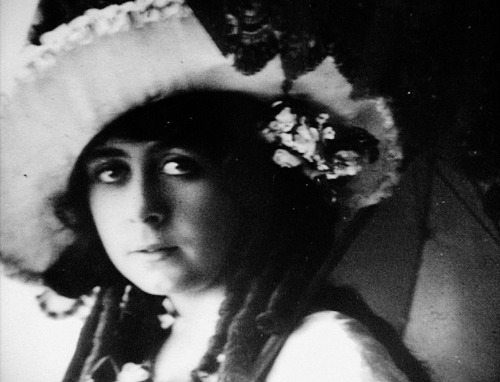
- Lottie Lyell, c. 1915
- Born: Charlotte Edith Cox; 23 February 1890; Balmain, New South Wales, Australia
- Died: 21 December 1925 (aged 35); Roseville, New South Wales, Australia
- Resting place: Macquarie Park Cemetery and Crematorium
- Occupations: Actress; screenwriter; editor; film producer
- Years active: 1911–1925
- Partner: Raymond Longford (1912–1925)

Lottie Lyell (born Charlotte Edith Cox; 23 February 1890 – 21 December 1925) was an Australian actress, screenwriter, editor and filmmaker. She is regarded as Australia's first film star, and also contributed to the local industry during the silent era through her collaborations with director and writer Raymond Longford.

== Early life and education ==
Charlotte "Lottie" Edith Cox was born in Balmain, a suburb in Sydney, New South Wales on 23 February 1890.

== Career ==
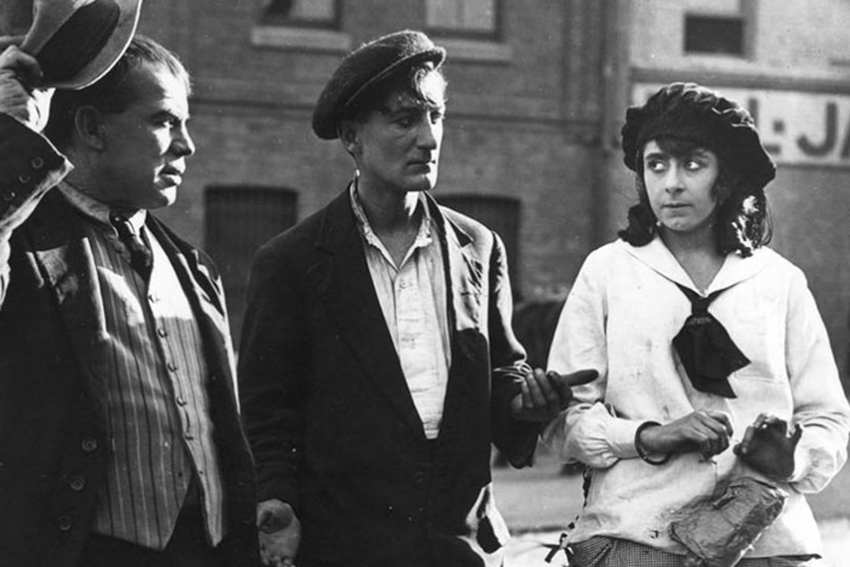
Arthur Tauchert, Gilbert Emery and Lyell during the filming of The Sentimental Bloke

Lyell started her acting career at the age of 17. She took the stage name of Lottie Lyell, and in 1910 at age 20 had her theatre breakthrough, when she performed as Maggie Brown in An Englishman's Home. The travelling theatre company took Lyell on tour for the show and she performed across Australia, including Tasmania, and New Zealand. After visiting 85 towns, the tour ended when a flood held up the production in Murtoa, Victoria. Lyell's later theatre successes continued when she joined the Clark and Meynell Company.

The following year, Lyell exchanged live theatre for a new, modern medium – film. She debuted in Alfred Rolfe's Captain Midnight, the Bush King, and by late 1911 her lead role in Raymond Longford's The Romantic Story of Margaret Catchpole (1911) transformed her into Australia's first international film star. The British magazine Punch wrote of the film, "This big film is the best that has been made in Australia".

Lyell and Longford formed one of the most influential and pioneering partnerships in Australian film history. In 1913 Lyell starred in 'Neath Austral Skies as Eileen Delmont. Notably in this role she performed her own stunts, which included riding a horse with a knife between her teeth and diving into the sea. Another Longford/Lyell film made in 1913, Australia Calls, contained some 'special effects' such as cardboard planes flying down wires, annihilating some Sydney landmarks.

Although Longford offered to film battlefronts during the Great War from 1914 until 1918, the Australian Government declined his offer. Longford and Lyell would never make a war related feature during the First World War.

In 1919, Lyell portrayed Doreen in The Sentimental Bloke, which is now regarded as the landmark piece of the Longford/Lyell collaborations. Lyell is believed to have also contributed to the screenplay, art direction, editing and production. In 1921, Lyell wrote, edited and co-directed The Blue Mountains Mystery to much critical acclaim. Longford and Lyell formed Longford-Lyell Australian Motion Picture Productions in 1922. Lyell also returned to acting in 1922 with Rudd's New Selection.

She was active until her death in 1925, and two of her screenplays, Peter Vernon's Silence and The Pioneers, were made into films the following year.

== Personal life ==
By 1912, Lyell had become romantically involved with Raymond Longford. The couple lived together in Brisbane. Although Longford was separated, his Catholic wife would not divorce him and he was never able to marry Lyell.

== Final years ==
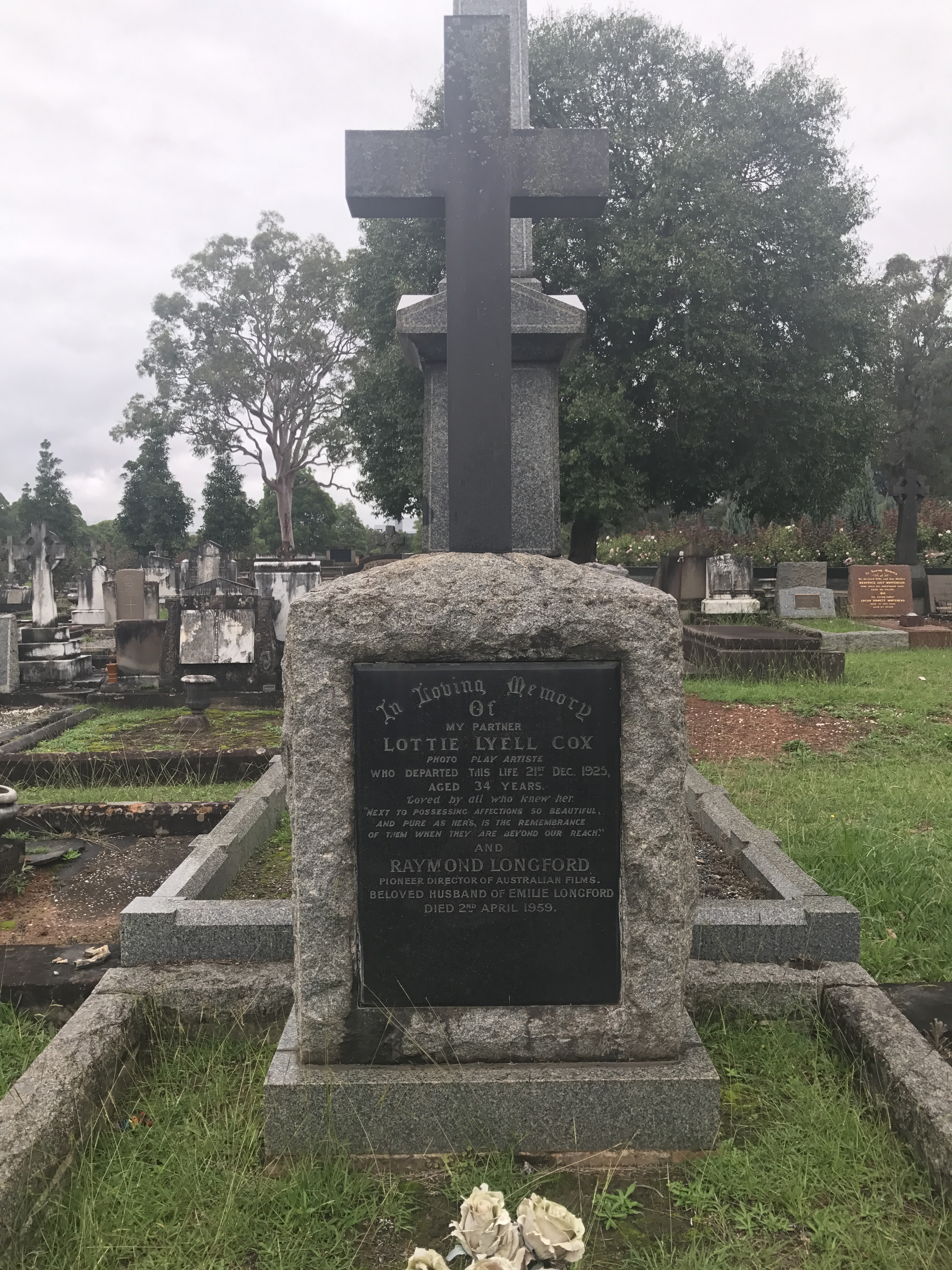
Graves of Lottie Lyell and Raymond Longford at Macquarie Park

In the early 1920s, Lyell's health declined. Lyell's sister, Lynda Cox, died in September 1925 at her residence, "Nurang," in Lord Street, Roseville, North Sydney.

Lottie Lyell died from tuberculosis on 21 December the same year at the same house. She was buried at Macquarie Park Cemetery and Crematorium. Both sisters were survived by their mother, but not their father Joseph.

Raymond Longford died on 2 April 1959 and was buried beside her.

== Honours and legacy ==
Lyell was posthumously inducted onto the Victorian Honour Roll of Women in 2001.

In October 2018, the inaugural Lottie Lyell Award was awarded to Shalom Almond at the Adelaide Film Festival, presented by Gillian Armstrong.

== Filmography ==
=== Actress ===
- Captain Midnight, the Bush King (1911)
- Captain Starlight, or Gentleman of the Road (1911)
- The Fatal Wedding as Mabel Wilson (1911)
- The Life of Rufus Dawes (1911)
- The Romantic Story of Margaret Catchpole as Margaret Catchpole (1911)
- The Tide of Death as Sylvia Grey (1912)
- The Midnight Wedding as Princess Astrea (1912)
- Australia Calls as Beatrice Evans (1913)
- Pommy Arrives in Australia or Pommy, the Funny Little New Chum (Australia) (1913)
- 'Neath Austral Skies as Eileen Delmont (1913)
- Trooper Campbell (1914) – short
- The Swagman's Story (1914) – short
- Taking his Chance (1914) – short
- The Silence of Dean Maitland as Marion, Henry's sister (1914)
- We'll Take her Children in amongst our own (1915)
- A Maori Maid's Love (1916)
- The Mutiny of the Bounty as Nessy Heywood (1916)
- The Church and the Woman as Eileen Shannon (1917)
- The Woman Suffers as Marjory Manton (1918)
- The Sentimental Bloke as Doreen (1919)
- Ginger Mick reprising her role as Doreen (1920)
- Rudd's New Selection as Nell Garvin (1921)
- The Dinkum Bloke reprising her role as Nell Garvin (1923)
- An Australian by Marriage (1923)

=== Writer ===
- Australia Calls (1913)
- The Mutiny of the Bounty (1916)
- The Sentimental Bloke (1919)
- On Our Selection (1920)
- Ginger Mick (1920)
- Rudd's New Selection (1921)
- The Blue Mountains Mystery (1921)
- The Dinkum Bloke (1923)
- Australia Calls (1923)
- The Bushwhackers (1925)
- The Pioneers (1926)
- Sons of Australia, screened as Peter Vernon's Silence (1926)

=== Editor ===
- The Mutiny of the Bounty (1916)
- The Sentimental Bloke (1919)

=== Producer ===
- The Dinkum Bloke (1923)

=== Assistant director ===
- The Dinkum Bloke (1923)

=== Director ===
- The Blue Mountains Mystery (1921)

== Theatre credits ==
- The Land of Gold by George Darrell (1907)
- vaudeville (1908)
- Geach touring company (1909)
- An Englishman's Home (1909)
- The Midnight Wedding (1910) – tour
- Why Men Love Women by Walter Howard (1910)
- The Fatal Wedding (1910) – tour with Raymond Longford and Gilbert Emery
- Her love against the world

== Resources ==
- Shirley, Graham; Adams, Brian (1983). Australian Cinema: The First 80 Years. Angus & Robertson Publishers. ISBN 0-207-14581-4.
