= The Mutiny of the Bounty =

1916 film

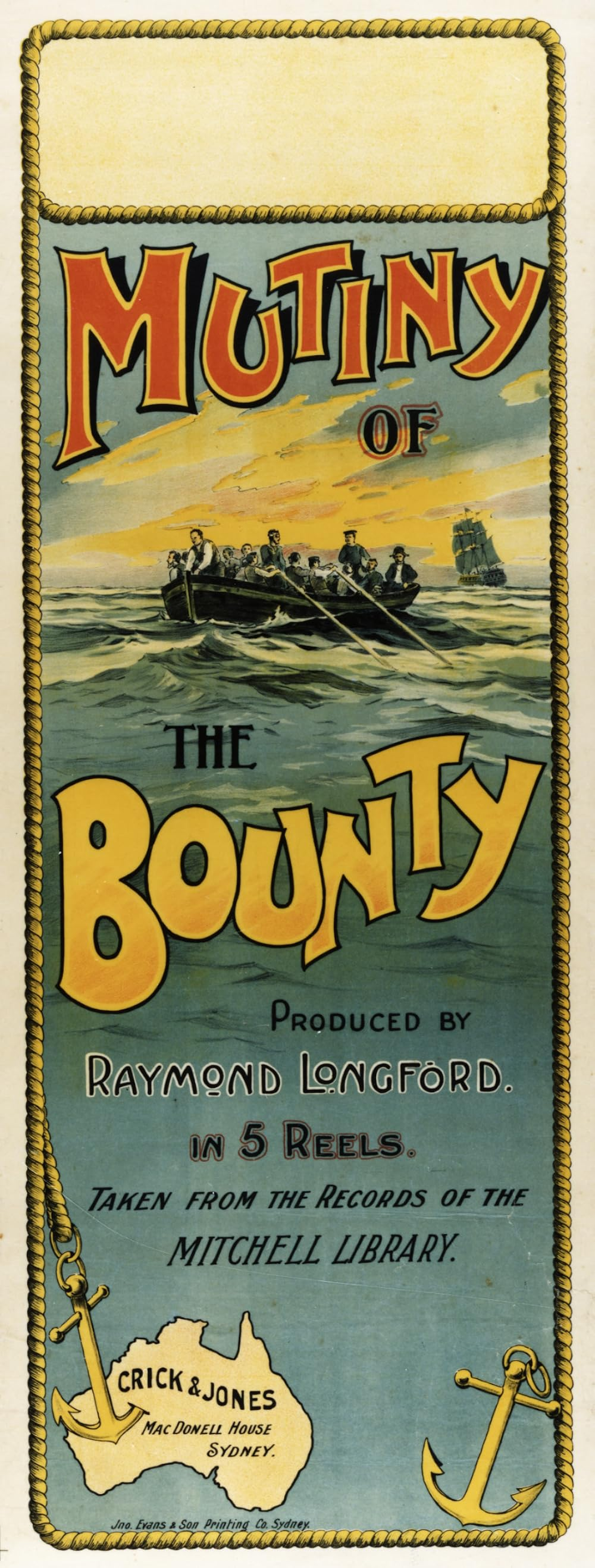
- Directed by: Raymond Longford
- Written by: Raymond Longford; Lottie Lyell
- Based on: Journals of Captain Bligh
- Produced by: Raymond Longford
- Starring: George Cross; John Storm; D.L. Dalziel; Wilton Power
- Cinematography: Charles Newham; Franklyn Barrett; A. O. Segerberg
- Production companies: Crick and Jones
- Distributed by: Hughes (NZ)
- Release date: 2 September 1916
- Running time: 55 minutes
- Countries: Australia, New Zealand
- Languages: Silent film English intertitles

The Mutiny of the Bounty is a 1916 Australian-New Zealand silent film directed by Raymond Longford about the mutiny aboard HMS Bounty. It is the first known cinematic dramatisation of this story and is considered a lost film.

== Plot ==
The story deals with the mutiny on HMS Bounty on 28 April 1789, Captain Bligh's journey back to England, the recapture of the mutineers on Tahiti and the subsequent fate of the other mutineers on Pitcairn Island. The story was structured in five acts.

== Cast ==
- George Cross as Captain Bligh
- John Storm as King George III
- D.L. Dalziel as Sir Joseph Banks
- Wilton Power as Fletcher Christian
- Reginald Collins as Midshipman Heywood
- Ernesto Crosetto as Midshipman Hallett
- Harry Beaumont as Mr Samuels
- Charles Villiers as Burkett
- Meta Taupopoki as Otoo
- Mere Amohau as Mere
- Ida Guildford as Mrs Heywood
- Lottie Lyell as Nessy Heywood

== Production ==
Filming took place in Rotorua, Sydney and Norfolk Island starting spring 1916. Norfolk Island is home to the descendants of the Bounty mutineers, who settled on the island in 1856 after their population became too large for the Pitcairn Islands. Māori actors played the Tahitians in the film.

Longford believed that Australia offered "unlimited opportunities for the picture maker." The harbours and coasts could serve as versatile backdrops, and whenever one of his films needed a scene set in England, he would use neighborhoods like Windsor that were built by early English settlers.

The movie was partly financed by distributors Stanley Crick and Herbert Finlay in association with J.D. Williams. The Adelaide newspaper the Mail speculated that the film "is probably the most costly production yet made in Australia." Attempts were made to ensure the script was as historically accurate as possible and Bligh was not as demonised as he would be in later film versions of this story.

While filming the scene where the mutineers board HMS Pandora, Longford allegedly had to signal a passing ship to move since it was visible in the shot. After signaling it again to give the all-clear, the ship revealed that it was also named Pandora.

== Release and reception ==
The film received good reviews and was a success at the box office. Hoyts Theatre initially purchased the exclusive distribution rights to Mutiny of the Bounty, and the film was released in Sydney on 2 September 1916. Following its exhibition at Hoyts, Crick and Jones showed the film in a tour of Australia. Lottie Lyell later supervised a recut for the British market.

The Mutiny of the Bounty was presented as an educational film as well as entertainment. It was endorsed by the Australian education department, and 2,000 school children attended the premiere. The Australian Historical Society was invited to a private exhibition before its release; its screening was accompanied by a lecture about H.M.S. Bounty. As part of the film's promotion, Hoyts hosted a writing contest, where students could submit an essay about the film for the chance to win £5 (AUD $621 in 2024).

The Sunday Times said of the film's release that "it has elevated Australian films to the level of those imported, and that the public is pleased is borne out by the letters to the producers of appreciation from well-known representative men." A review in the W.A. Record remarked that "the picture tells this thrilling bit of Australian history in graphic style, and the scenery is, to describe it in a word, glorious." The Examiner called it "Robinson Crusoe in real life."

Some contemporary Australian critics complained that the production was too ambitious for a fledgling film industry. The Sun said, "The industry must walk before it can run ... If we regard The Mutiny of the Bounty as the first attempt of Australia to turn out an elaborate picture, we must feel well satisfied. But if we simply regard it as a film to meet the best imported products on even terms, we must recognise that we still have much to learn."

The Australian Historical Society commended Longford for the film's authentic portrayal of the mutiny, saying, "The pictures were much appreciated by the representatives of the Society, not only because of the technical skill shown in their production (though it is pleasing to think that Australian workmanship is capable of such excellence), but also because of the accuracy observed in the presentation of historical detail."

== Gallery ==
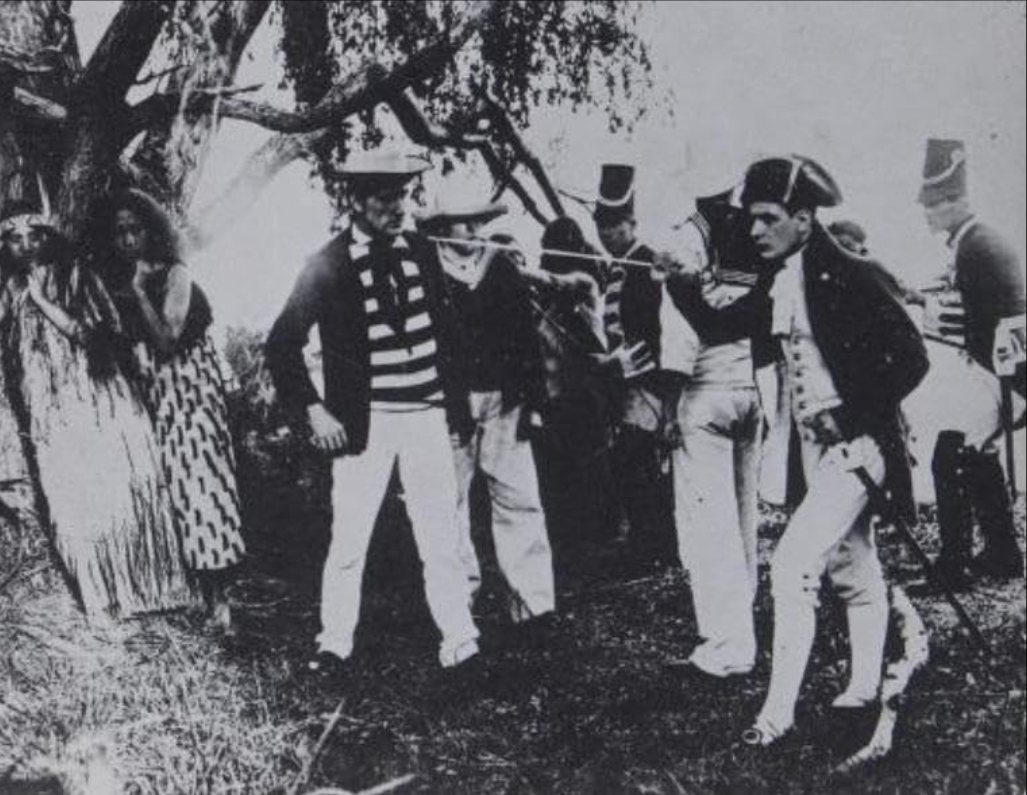
George Cross as Captain Bligh.

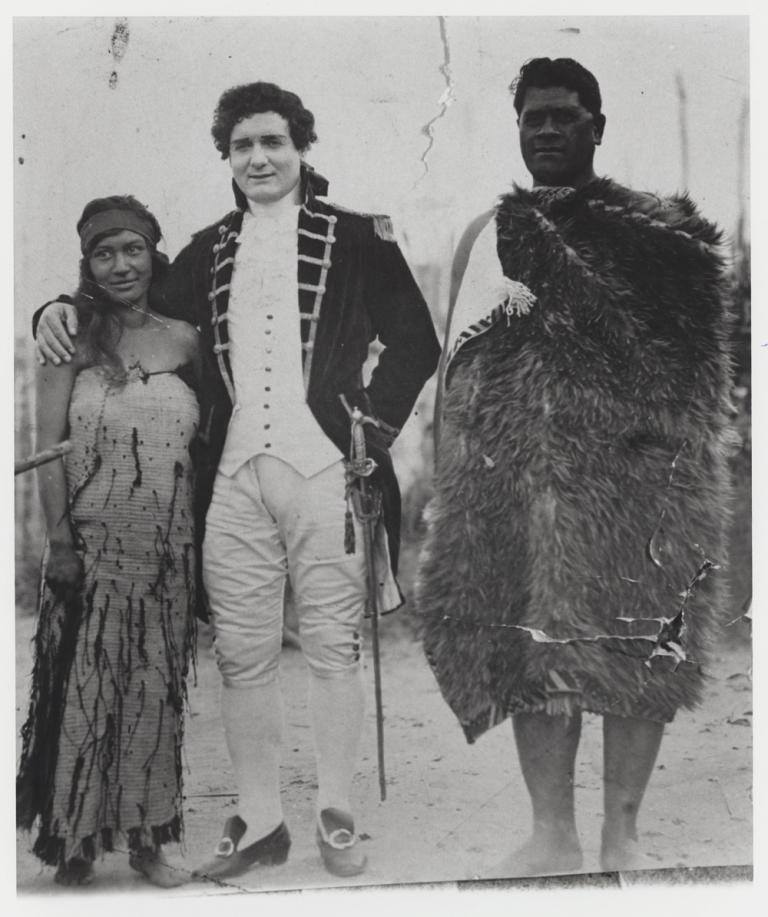
Three of the actors in the 1916 adaptation.

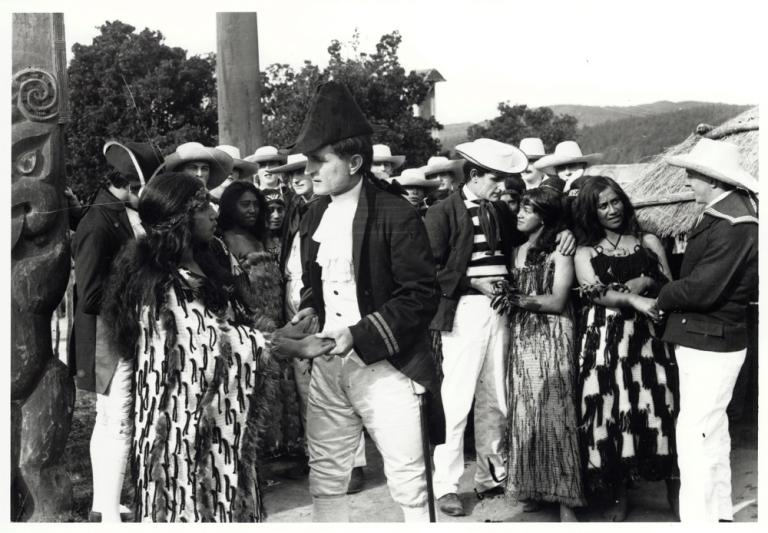
A frame from the film.
