= Harrison Owen =

Australian writer (1890–1966)

- Born: Albert John Owen; June 24, 1890; Geelong, Victoria, Australia
- Died: 30 May 1966 (aged 75); St Kilda East, Victoria, Australia
- Occupation: Novelist
- Writing career
- Genres: Literature, children's literature, non-fiction, short story

Albert John "Harrison" Owen (24 June 1890 – 30 May 1966) was an Australian playwright, novelist, poet, and journalist.

== Career ==
Although Owen spent most of his life as a daily journalist, his creative flair was never jeopardized. Throughout his life he published most of his poetic writings and stories. His first novel The Mount Marunga Mystery was published in 1919. He released a collective of his satirical and verse poetry from The Bulletin in 1923, entitled Tommyrot Rhymes for Children and Grown-ups who Ought to Know Better.

With many of his Bulletin workmates, Owen co-founded the now defunct Australian Authors' and Writers' Guild in 1915.

From 1920, Owen moved to London and worked as a freelance journalist. He returned to Melbourne in 1940.
