= The Sentimental Bloke =

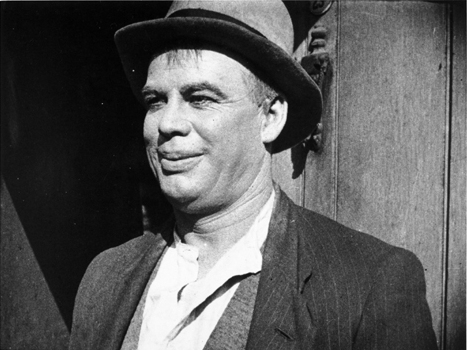
- Arthur Tauchert, in The Sentimental Bloke
- Directed by: Raymond Longford
- Written by: Lottie Lyell
- Based on: The Songs of a Sentimental Bloke by C. J. Dennis
- Produced by: Raymond Longford
- Starring: Arthur Tauchert; Lottie Lyell; Gilbert Emery
- Cinematography: Arthur Higgins
- Production company: Southern Cross Feature Film Company
- Distributed by: E. J. Carroll
- Release date: 4 October 1919
- Running time: 106 minutes
- Country: Australia
- Languages: Silent film English intertitles
- Budget: £2,000
- Box office: over £33,000

The Sentimental Bloke is a 1919 Australian silent film based on the 1915 verse novel The Songs of a Sentimental Bloke by C. J. Dennis. Produced and directed by Raymond Longford, the film stars Arthur Tauchert, Gilbert Emery, and Lottie Lyell, who also co-wrote the film with Longford.

A major critical and commercial success upon its release in Australia, the film was also popular in New Zealand and Great Britain, and is generally considered the greatest Australian silent film, and one of the best Australian movies of all time. The film inspired a sequel, Ginger Mick (1920), and a 1932 remake. In 2004, the National Film and Sound Archive released a fully restored version of The Sentimental Bloke, making it one of the few Australian silent films to survive intact.

== Plot ==
Bill is a Woolloomooloo larrikin, who vows to abandon his life of gambling (playing Two-up) and drinking after a spell in gaol following a raid on a two up game. He falls in love with Doreen (Lyell), who works in a pickle factory, but faces competition from a more sophisticated rival, Stror 'at Coot.

Bill and Doreen argue, but are eventually reunited and get married. Bill gives up drinking and hanging out with his mate, Ginger Mick, and becomes a family man. He gets an offer from his uncle to manage an orchard in the country, and he and Doreen settle down there with their baby.

== Cast ==
- Arthur Tauchert as Bill, the Bloke
- Lottie Lyell as Doreen
- Gilbert Emery as Ginger Mick
- Stanley Robinson as the Bloke's friend
- Harry Young as the Stror 'at Coot
- Margaret Reid as Doreen's mother
- Charles Keegan as the parson
- William Coulter as Uncle Jim
- Helen Fergus as nurse
- C. J. Dennis as himself

== Development ==
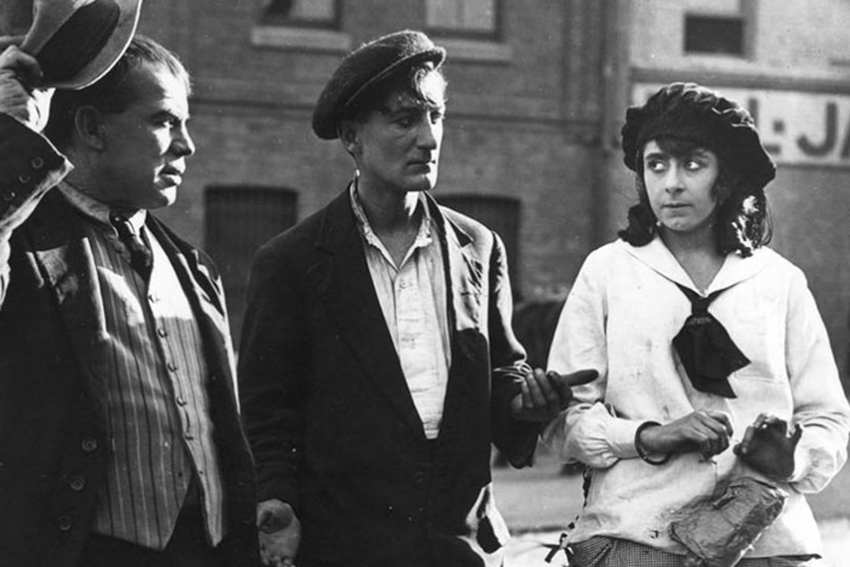
Tauchert, Emery and Lyell during the filming of The Sentimental Bloke

C. J. Dennis' original book had been a best seller since its publication in 1915. It was read by executive J. D. Williams who gave Raymond Longford a copy and suggested it might make a good movie. Longford gave it to his partner Lottie Lyell and she was supportive.

Finance was provided by an Adelaide company, the Southern Cross Feature Film Company who had funded The Woman Suffers. C. J. Dennis was reluctant to give away the movie rights for fear it would affect book sales, however he eventually agreed after prolonged negotiations and a royalty payment of £1,000, half the film's budget. (Another account says Dennis' fee was £950.)

In March 1918, it was announced that Southern Cross had bought the rights and Longford would produce. In April Dennis arrived in Adelaide to give his thoughts on the script. He said The Sentimental Bloke had sold over 100,000 copies while its sequel Ginger Mick had sold more than 70,000 copies.

Dennis had tried to write the script himself but found it too difficult, so Lottie Lyell did it. The script relocated the story from Melbourne to Woolloomooloo in Sydney.

Arthur Tauchert had extensive experience working in suburban vaudeville but had only made two short movies prior to this.

== Production ==
The movie was shot in 1918 on location in Woolloomooloo, with the orchard scenes done at Hornsby Valley near Sydney, and interiors at open-air sets at Wonderland City, Bondi (which meant Longford could avoid paying excessive rental for using sets at the Rushcutters Bay Studio). Some shots of sunsets and sunrises for the inter titles were done in Adelaide.

Sydney authorities refused to allow police uniforms to be depicted, or for shooting to take place in the city's gaols. However Longford managed to persuade Commonwealth dockside officials to appear as policemen and let him use an old watch house in Woolloomooloo.

Dennis appeared as himself at the beginning and found the experience nerve-wracking.

== Reception ==
=== Previews ===
The movie was first screened privately at Adelaide Wondergraph on 26 November 1918, in the presence of Dennis and the filmmakers.

The Adelaide Register called it a "triumph" adding "the acting was excellent throughout, and the orchestra provided a special musical synchronisation. Enthusiastic applause was forthcoming from the audience, at the conclusion of the picture".

The Advertiser said " The photography and general setting of the picture are admirable... it is deeply human and true to the nature of a big class of city dwellers in the crowded areas. When it goes abroad it will reveal to the world outside something of the originality and unconventionality of the Australian. The company should be heartily congratulated up this example of its effort."

On 3 December 1918 the film was shown privately in Melbourne at the Majestic Theatre. The Argus called it "an excellent adaptation of the book." The Age said "In the picture, as the book, the pure sentiment has a kind of divine alchemy, in which the slang has a quite natural place. "

Weekly Times said "Mr Dennis's work has been visualised with a masterly appraisement of tone values."

=== Release ===
It took a while for the film to be released as Australasian Films refused to screen the movie in the Union Theatre chain. However it was seen by E. J. Carroll who decided to distribute it in Australia and overseas.

The Sentimental Bloke uses intertitles taken from the original poem written in Australian slang and was a hit when it opened in Melbourne Town Hall on 4 October 1919, breaking all existing box office records. It was also popular in Britain and New Zealand, but did not succeed in the U.S., where test audiences failed to understand the language. Despite being recut with Americanised intertitles, having some scenes cut out, and being renamed for the American market as The Story of a Tough Guy, it was withdrawn from distribution.

Variety called it "the best Australian made feature to date."

According to one account, by 1922 the film had earned £33,000.

The initial success of The Sentimental Bloke prompted a sequel in 1920, Ginger Mick, and a remake in 1932, using the latest sound recording equipment from the United States. The sequel was a hit but the remake, although directed by the prolific actor and partner of Hoyts, F. W. Thring, did not fare as well as the original.

E. J. Carroll also sponsored a stage version of the book in 1922, produced by Bert Bailey and starring Walter Cornoch as the Bloke and Tal Ordell as Ginger Mick.

In 1931 Raymond Longford claimed that the film had been made for £900 and grossed £50,000 around the world.

== Rediscovery ==
The Sentimental Bloke

A 1952 fire in a Melbourne film library destroyed all but two boxes of film archives. The boxes revealed a complete 35mm nitrate positive of The Sentimental Bloke, which the following year were sent to a Sydney laboratory for duplication on to new 16mm acetate stock. The original nitrate copies were believed to have been destroyed in the 1960s. The new print was screened at the 1955 Sydney Film Festival to great acclaim, although Longford was not invited, as the organisers did not realise he was still alive.

The film also screened at the 1987 Cannes Film Festival.

An original 35mm negative of the film was discovered in 1973 at the Film Archive at George Eastman House International Museum of Photography and Film in Rochester, New York. The canisters had been mislabelled as The Sentimental Blonde but were discovered by luck. The film was the U.S. version which had some scenes deleted and included intertitles for the American audience. However, it was a better quality print than any of the Australian copies, and provided a base for a complete restoration.

The National Film and Sound Archive commenced on a full restoration project for the film in 2000, using the various pieces of archive material available. The project included colour tinting as close as possible to the original. This 'new' version premiered at the 2004 Sydney Film Festival and has played at the 2005 London Film Festival. It has since been released as a two DVD set which includes a booklet describing the film's history.

To celebrate the film's 100th anniversary, the National Film and Sound Archive commissioned musician Paul Mac to compose a new score to accompany the film. It was performed live by Mac during screenings.

== See also ==
- Cinema of Australia
- List of films based on poems
- Albert Arlen – composer of The Sentimental Bloke musical
