= Arthur Tauchert =

Australian actor (1877–1933)

Arthur Michael Tauchert
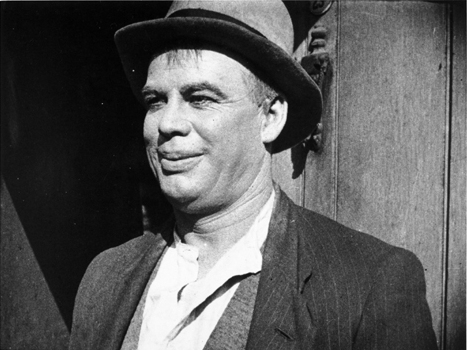
- Tauchert in The Sentimental Bloke, 1919
- Born: August 21, 1877; Sydney, Australia
- Died: November 27, 1933 (aged 56)
- Occupations: Acrobatic comedian; dancer; singer; film actor

Arthur Michael Tauchert (pronounced "Torcher") (21 August 1877 – 27 November 1933) was an Australian acrobatic comedian, dancer, singer, film actor, and star of the Australian silent film, The Sentimental Bloke (1919).

== Biography ==
Born in the inner Sydney suburb of Waterloo on 21 August 1877, Tauchert's career as an entertainer began in the early 1900s as a vaudeville comedian and over the next two decades he was associated with most of the leading management firms of that era, including John Fuller, James Brennan, Ted Holland, Harry Clay, Bert Howard, J. C. Bain and Lennon, Hyman and Lennon. Although he mostly worked as a specialist solo act, Tauchert teamed up at various times with other comics, including Albert McKisson (ex-McKisson and Kearns), Bert Corrie, Ted Tutty, and Ern Delavale.

After the success of The Sentimental Bloke, Tauchert appeared in at least ten more films including Ginger Mick (1920), again based on the poems of C. J. Dennis. He continued to perform on the vaudeville stage during the remainder of the 1920s, often presenting an act based on his famous "Bill the Bloke" character. In the late 1920s and early 1930s, he also appeared on radio.

Tauchert has received very little historical attention even though he played a significant part in Australia's early film industry and his contemporaries clearly considered him to be among the country's top entertainers. One prominent American singer, Lou London, even said of him: "I consider Arthur Tauchert one of the most original individuals I have met; he is also one of the best-dispositioned men I have ever had the pleasure of working alongside." London backed his opinion shortly before returning home by giving Tauchert the exclusive Australasian rights to all the songs he had worked on in Australia, as well as several he had not performed (Everyone's 12 Oct. 1921, p. 20).

== Death ==
Tauchert died of cancer on 27 November 1933, and was survived by Elizabeth, his wife of 24 years, and his three children. He was buried in Waverley Cemetery.

== Filmography ==
- Charlie at the Sydney Show (1916) - short
- The Sentimental Bloke (1919)
- Ginger Mick (1920)
- The Jackeroo of Coolabong (1920)
- The Dinkum Bloke (1923)
- The Digger Earl (1923)
- Joe (1924)
- The Moth of Moombie (1926)
- For the Term of His Natural Life (1927 film)
- The Adorable Outcast (1928)
- Odds On (1929)
- Fellers (1930)
- Showgirl's Luck (1931).

== Sources ==
- Arthur Tauchert. Biography at the Australian Variety Theatre Archive.
- Brodsky, Isadore. Streets of Sydney Sydney: Old Sydney Free Press, 1962, pp. 106–7.
- Mr Arthur Tauchert. Courier Mail 28 November (1933), p. 15.
- Obituary. Argus 28 November (1933), p. 6.
- Obituary: Mr Arthur Tauchert. Sydney Morning Herald 28 November (1933), p. 13.
- Tauchert, Arthur. Biography at AustLit
