= The Romantic Story of Margaret Catchpole =

- Lottie Lyell as Margaret Catchpole
- Directed by: Raymond Longford
- Written by: Raymond Longford
- Based on: the play An English Lass by Alfred Dampier & C. H. Krieger book The History of Margaret Catchpole: A Suffolk Girl by Richard Cobbold
- Produced by: Cosens Spencer
- Starring: Lottie Lyell
- Cinematography: Ernest Higgins
- Edited by: Ernest Higgins
- Production company: Spencer's Pictures
- Distributed by: Sawyer Inc. (US)
- Release dates: 7 August 1911; 1913
- Running time: 3,000 feet (approx 50 mins)
- Country: Australia
- Languages: Silent film; English intertitles

The Romantic Story of Margaret Catchpole (also released as The Queen of the Smugglers) is a 1911 Australian silent film directed by Raymond Longford and starring Lottie Lyell. It is based on the true story of Margaret Catchpole, an adventurer and convict. Only the first 24 minutes of the 50-minute runtime survives today.

== Synopsis ==
In the south coast of England, a young woman, Margaret Catchpole (Lottie Lyell), is pursued by two men, the smuggler Will Laud (Raymond Longford) and the coastguard officer Lieutenant Barry (Augustus Neville). Laud is killed in a fight with coast guards and Margaret is sentenced to Botany Bay for horse stealing. She later marries Barry, who has since moved to Sydney, and becomes well-regarded for her hospital work.

== Cast ==
- Lottie Lyell as Margaret Catchpole
- Raymond Longford as Will Laud
- Augustus Neville as Lieutenant Barry
- Sybil Wilde as Little Kitty
- William Coulter as Lord Chief Justice
- E. Melville as Justice Heath
- Fred Hardy as Chaloner Archdeckne
- J. Eldridge as Landlord of the Bull Inn
- Jack Goodall as Edward Catchpole
- J. Howard as Reverend O'Gharty
- H. Parker as Lieutenant Bourne
- C. Swain as Landlord of the Chester Inn
- Fred Twitcham as Mr. Cobbold
- Walter Vincent as Captain Luff, a smuggler

== Novel and play ==
The History of Margaret Catchpole: A Suffolk Girl
- Author: Richard Cobbold
- Language: English
- Publication date: 1845
- Publication place: England

The film was based on Richard Cobbold's 1845 historical novel The History of Margaret Catchpole: A Suffolk Girl.

The novel had also been dramatised in the play Margaret Catchpole, the Heroine of Sussex (1845) by Edward Sterling, played at the Charlie Napier Theatre, Ballarat, in November 1859. A later adaptation An English Lass by Alfred Dampier and C. H. Krieger, was played at the Standard Theatre, Sydney in 1887. The play was revived in 1893.

The structure of the play was as follows:

- ACT 1 – Birthplace of Margaret Catchpole at Naeton, Suffolk. A May Day Morning.
- ACT 2 – Temptation. The conflict between Right and Wrong.
- ACT 3 – Scene 1 : Ipswich Gaol, Under Sentence of Death.
- ACT 3 – Scene 2: A street in Ipswich. The Escape. The Pursuit.
- ACT 3 – Scene 3 : The Ruins of Walton Castle. Death of Laud.
- ACT 4 – The Assigned Convict Servant.
- ACT 5 – Lost in the Bush. Heroism of Margaret.

Laurence Irving, son of Sir Henry Irving, also produced a play on Catchpole which premiered in 1911.

== Production ==
Spencer had produced three films based on plays by Alfred Dampier under the direction of Alfred Rolfe and wanted to make a fourth. However Rolfe left Spencer to run the Australian Photo-Play Company so Raymond Longford, who had worked on the earlier films as an actor, stepped in as director.

The film was shot in July 1911. No screenwriter was credited.

It enabled Lottie Lyell to demonstrate her skills as a horsewoman. Spencer's own horse "Arno", specially imported from England, appears.

The first half of the film, the section set in England, survives today. Comprising 1,596 feet at 24 minutes it is the earliest surviving example of the work of Lyell and Raymond Longford.

== Release and reception ==
The film was successful at the box office and received strong reviews. The critic from The Sydney Morning Herald stated that:

Mr Spencer has now produced several Australian taken and manufactured pictures, all of which have been of highest class, but it is questionable if he has done anything better than his latest effort. From the first scene to the last the pictures are good, the flicker being reduced to a minimum... Set among charming old-world scenery with the quaint costumes of our great grandparents the opening scene of the May-day dance is a jewel picture, and the promise of the opening scene is fulfilled throughout. The cliff and water scenery one can safely say, has never been surpassed in Australian picture shows. Through all her varying tones, from peaceful home in England to happiness in Australia, Margaret is charming, and carries the sympathy of the audience with her. Last in the cast of characters, but far from last in the hearts of the audience, are the splendid horses that play so important a part in the story.

It was also released in the United States as The Queen of the Smugglers.
