= Raymond Longford =

Australian filmmaker and actor (1878–1959)

- Portrait of Raymond Longford, c. 1935
- Born: John Walter Hollis Longford; 23 September 1878; Hawthorn, Victoria, Australia
- Died: 2 April 1959 (aged 80); North Sydney, New South Wales, Australia
- Other name: Raymond Hollis Longford
- Occupations: Director; actor; screenwriter; editor; film producer
- Years active: 1911–1941
- Spouses: Melena Louisa Keen (m. 1900; div. 1926) Emilie Elizabeth Anschutz (m. 1933)
- Children: 1

Raymond Longford (born John Walter Hollis Longford; 23 September 1878 – 2 April 1959) was a prolific Australian film director, writer, producer, and actor during the silent era. Longford was a major director of the silent film era of the Australian cinema. He formed a production team with Lottie Lyell. His contributions to Australian cinema with his ongoing collaborations with Lyell, including The Sentimental Bloke (1919) and The Blue Mountains Mystery (1921), prompted the Australian Film Institute's AFI Raymond Longford Award, inaugurated in 1968, to be named in his honour.

== Biography ==
John Walter Hollis Longford was born in Hawthorn, a suburb of Melbourne, the son of John Walter Longford, a civil servant originally from Sydney, and his English wife, Charlotte Maria, née Hollis, who married in 1870. His family soon started referring to him as "Ray". By 1880, they briefly moved to Paynesville, then went to Sydney when Longford's father became a warder at Darlinghurst Gaol.

Longford became a sailor and spent his early life at sea. He started acting on the stage in India under the name Raymond Hollis Longford. In the early 1900s he toured Australia and New Zealand with Edwin Geach's Popular Dramatic Organisation, and Clarke and Meynell companies. He was a stage manager for the Liliam Meyers Dramatic Company. Longford often appeared alongside a young actress called Lottie Lyell, who would become Longford's key creative partner.

He was an early member of the Australian actors union, a forerunner to Actors Equity.

=== Film career ===
In 1907, Longford worked on a film produced by Cosens Spencer about the fight between Tommy Burns and Jack Johnson, probably the first movie Longford was involved in. He then began appearing in movies for Spencer as an actor under the direction of Alfred Rolfe such as Captain Midnight, the Bush King (1911).

=== Move into directing ===
Rolfe eventually left Spencer's company to make films elsewhere, so in 1911 Spencer hired Longford to direct his first feature, The Fatal Wedding, adapted from a play in which Longford had appeared on stage and starring Lyell. Made quickly, with a limited budget and small crew, it was a major financial success and launched his career behind the camera.

Longford followed this up with several other play adaptations for Spencer including The Romantic Story of Margaret Catchpole (1911), Sweet Nell of Old Drury and The Midnight Wedding (1912); Longford also wrote an original for the screen The Tide of Death. Lyell appeared in most of these and also made increasingly important contributions behind the scene as a writer, editor, producer, and co-director.

=== Freelancing ===
Cosens Spencer eventually withdrew from Australian film production due to the formation of "the Combine" (which absorbed Spencer's old company and preferred exhibiting proven imports to production). This left Longford without his main backer and he found it increasingly difficult to secure funding for a time.

He went to work for the Fraser Film Release and Photographic Company for whom he made a feature and a number of shorts, however, they ended the contract after Longford became involved in a lawsuit following the making of the highly popular The Silence of Dean Maitland (1914).

Longford had an operation in March 1915.

He made another number of shorts for a variety of companies and taught film acting. He then made two films in New Zealand and also became embroiled in another legal battle over The Church and the Woman (1917). Longford had lifted the story from a book published in the 1880s. The substantial profits from his film that he made for the Pugliese family, were given to the original books author.

In September 1916, he worked for Crick and Jones preparing scenarios.

=== Career peak: The Sentimental Bloke ===
Longford's career revived towards the end of World War I when he helped establish the Southern Cross Feature Film Company in South Australia. He enjoyed a large box office success with The Woman Suffers (1918) (despite the film being banned in New South Wales) which enabled him to get finance for an adaptation of the poetry of C. J. Dennis, The Sentimental Bloke (1919). This was an enormous critical and popular success, and is regarded as one of the greatest Australian films of all time. Longford followed it with another hit, On Our Selection (1920), from the stories of Steele Rudd.

The popularity of these two movies saw Longford move away from melodramatic convention to more realistic treatment of subject matter. He said around this time:

You see, one might say that three parts of your picture audience is composed of women, and women, above everything else, are impressionists. It is the human, and not the spectacular side of a film that captures their attention and win their sympathy and admiration. A man coming out of a picture show will be heard to remark to his mate: "s'wonderful the way they get these things up, ain't it, nowadays.' He has been looking at oit in a speculative light, but not so the woman. She says nothing, but she wipes the tears from her eyes, tears of real sympathy, indicative of pure appreciation, and for days thereafter, thinks, not of the construction of the plot, nor its cleverness, but of the varied experiences and emotions through which the hero and heroine have passed.

Both Bloke and Selection led to well-received sequels which were also directed by Longford. He and Lyell had another hit with The Blue Mountains Murder Mystery.

=== Decline ===
As the 1920s went on, Longford again found difficulties securing finance and/or distribution for his films. He and Lyell formed a company, and he made some movies for Australasian Films, but the collaboration was not a successful one. In October 1925, Longford was appointed producer of Master Pictures.

In 1925, Lottie Lyell died of tuberculosis; Longford's career never recovered.

In 1926, it was announced Longford would serve on the board of the film company Phillips Film Productions Ltd, but little seems to have come of this. He gave evidence at the 1928 Royal Commission on the Moving Picture Industry in Australia, where he urged the introduction of a quota for local movies and complained about the influence of the Combine of Australasian Films and Union Theatres on local production.

Longford appeared in bankruptcy court in 1929 but managed to tour Europe the following year, spending 18 months touring various filmmaking facilities. "Naturally the talkies have revolutionised everything", he said. "And to some extent I now feel as if I am returning to my original occupation – the talking stage."

He returned to Australia in February 1930 and told Gayne Dexter that:

For years and years I fought for the English industry. For years and years I battled and agitated against the Americans. But now, after seeing the English film men at work, I am sorry to say that I backed the wrong side. It was only through the kindness of the American executives in London – the very men against whom I had fought – that I was able to visit studios and get an insight into production conditions. I am convinced that it is impossible for anybody to teach England to make pictures: the producers don't want to learn: the English distributors don't want Australian films: and if we ever get a market there, our productions will have to be through Australian channels. That has already been demonstrated by the fact that English distributors have not accepted a single Australian film, even under the quota laws, whereas the American distributors operating in the British Isles have taken eight or ten – and paid cash for them!

Longford said UFA were the most advanced studio he saw.

=== Sound era ===
On his return to Australia, Longford sought financing for a film about the Australian Light Horse in World War I, Desert Legion, with a budget of £50,000. He was unable to secure this and started lobbying for a quota for local films.

In the early 1930s, Longford worked steadily as an actor and assistant director on such films as Diggers in Blighty. He assisted Beaumont Smith with the direction of The Hayseeds (1933) and Splendid Fellows (1934) (according to contemporary reports he directed The Hayseeds - it appears he began directing but then Smith took over, impatiet with Longford's speed).

He managed to direct another feature, The Man They Could Not Hang (1934), although he missed the premiere due to an illness which required hospitalization. In the same year, he was elected head of the New South Wales Talking Picture Producers Association with the aim of promoting a quota for Australian films.

=== Mastercraft ===
In 1935, he established Mastercraft Film Corporation Ltd to take advantage of the 1935 NSW Quota Act, but the hoped-for boom in production did not eventuate, and Mastercraft never received the subscribers they needed to become viable; therefore, they made no movies. The company was eventually bought out Stuart F. Doyle.

In 1939, Longford sued some Mastercraft executives for libel and settled out of court.

=== Later years ===
Longford managed to stay employed in the film industry during the 1930s but found this impossible with the advent of World War II, which brought local production to an almost complete halt. During the war, he was a clerk for the U.S. military stationed in Australia; then he became a tally man and night watchman on the Sydney wharfs.

In October 1950, Longford was profiled by Ernest Harrison for AM magazine; then, in 1955, a complete 35 mm print of The Sentimental Bloke was discovered and screened at the Sydney and Melbourne Film Festivals, bringing renewed attention to Longford. He died on 2 April 1959 at the age of 80.

== Personal life and death ==
Longford married Melena Louisa Keen at St Luke's Anglican Church, Concord, Sydney, on 5 February 1900. They had one child, a son, Victor Hollis Longford. Longford and Melena later separated, and he started a relationship with Lottie Lyell, but he could not marry her because Melena refused to divorce him until 1926, the year after Lyell died. Melina was influenced by her father, William Henry Keen, who did not approve of divorce. William Keen died in 1922. In 1933, Longford married for a second time, to Emilie Elizabeth Anschutz.

Longford died on 2 April 1959 in North Sydney, at the age of 80. He is buried at Macquarie Park cemetery, North Ryde, alongside Lottie Lyell.

== Longford Lyell Life Achievement Award ==
Named in Longford and Lottie Lyell's honour, the AACTA Longford Lyell Award is the Australian film industry's highest accolade for an individual based on their contributions to "unwavering commitment over many years to excellence in the film and television industries and has, through their body of work to date, contributed substantially to the enrichment of Australian screen culture". Since the introduction of the award by the Australian Film Institute in 1968, winners have included Ken G. Hall, Peter Weir, Tim Burstall, Bud Tingwell, David Stratton, George Miller, Phillip Adams, Barry Jones, Jack Thompson, Geoffrey Rush, and Cate Blanchett.

== Filmography ==
=== Director ===
- The Fatal Wedding (1911)
- The Romantic Story of Margaret Catchpole (1911)
- Sweet Nell of Old Drury (1911)
- The Tide of Death (1912)
- The Midnight Wedding (1912)
- Naming the Federal Capital of Australia (1913) – 1,020-foot documentary
- Australia Calls (1913)
- Pommy Arrives in Australia (1913)
- 'Neath Austral Skies (1913)
- The Swagman's Story (1914)
- The Silence of Dean Maitland (1914)
- Taking his Chance (1914) – short
- Trooper Campbell (1914) – short
- We'll Take her Children in amongst our own (1915) – short
- Ma Hogan's New Boarder (1915) – short
- The Mutiny of the Bounty (1916)
- A Maori Maid's Love (1916)
- The Church and the Woman (1917)
- The Woman Suffers (1918)
- The Sentimental Bloke (1919)
- Ginger Mick (1920)
- On Our Selection (1920)
- Rudd's New Selection (1921)
- The Blue Mountains Mystery (1921)
- The Dinkum Bloke (1923)
- Australia Calls (1923) – documentary
- An Australian by Marriage (1923) – documentary
- Australia Land of Sunshine (1923) – documentary
- Fisher's Ghost (1924)
- The Bushwhackers (1925)
- Peter Vernon's Silence (1926)
- The Pioneers (1926)
- Sunrise (1926)
- Hills of Hate (1926)
- Harmony Row (1933) (associate director)
- Waltzing Matilda (1933) (associate director)
- Diggers in Blighty (1933) (assoc director)
- The Hayseeds (1933) (assistant director)
- Splendid Fellows (1934) (assistant director)
- The Man They Could Not Hang (1934)

=== Actor only ===
- The Life and Adventures of John Vane, the Notorious Australian Bushranger (1910)
- Captain Midnight, the Bush King (1911)
- Captain Starlight, or Gentleman of the Road (1911)
- The Life of Rufus Dawes (1911) as Gabbett
- Diggers in Blighty (1933) as Von Schieling
- The Avenger (1937) as Warren
- Dad and Dave Come to Town (1938) as Policeman
- Wings of Destiny (1940) as Peters
- Dad Rudd, MP (1940) as Electoral Officer
- Racing Luck (1941)
- The Power and the Glory (1941)

=== Crew member ===
- Burns and Johnson Fight (1908) – 4,000-foot film
- It's a Long Way to Tipperary (1915)
- The Sentimental Bloke (1932)
- His Royal Highness (1932)

== Theatre credits ==
- Camille
- The Power of the Cross
- Saturday Night in London (1907)
- The Worst Woman in London (1907)
- The Heart of a Hero by Lingford Carson (1908) – Edwin Geach Dramatic Organisation
- The Midnight Hour (1908)
- The Woman Pays (1908)
- The Greatest Scoundrel Living by McLeod Loder (1908) – starring May Renno – also played with A Woman's Honour (1908) and The Professor's Dilemma (1908) – Longford directed
- Who is the Woman? (1909) – directed for the May Renno Company
- An Englishman's Home (1909) – with Lottie Lyell
- The Midnight Wedding (1910) – with Lyell
- Her Love Against the World and Why Men Love Women (1910) – with Lyell
- The Fatal Wedding (1910)
- Every Inch a Man (1910) – toured with The Fatal Wedding
- Officer 666 (1922)
- Treasure Island (1932) – Melbourne

== Unfilmed projects ==
Among the projects Longford planned but did not film included:

- a screen version of Robbery Under Arms;
- The Desert Legion, a tale of the Australian Lighthorse in the Sinai and Palestine Campaign during World War I;
- four unnamed projects for Mastercraft films in the 1930s, which were to be made under Longford's supervision.
