= By Wireless Telegraphy =

- Labor Call 20 Oct 1910
- Written by: "Anson Grave" (William Anderson and Roy Redgrave)
- Original language: English
- Genre: melodrama
- Setting: Royal Music Hall, London; R.M.S. Richmond at sea

Premiere
- Date premiered: October 22, 1910
- Place premiered: Kings Theatre, Melbourne

By Wireless Telegraphy was a 1910 Australian play by William Anderson and Roy Redgrave.

== Background ==
The play was based on the case of Hawley Harvey Crippen who was still on trial when the play went into production.

The cast included regulars like Bert Bailey and Edmund Duggan. Anderson's regular star, Eugenie Duggan, did not appear however as she was resting (although her name featured in advertising).

According to the Weekly Times "The author... has shown enterprise rather than originality. He has practically dramatised a sensational case which, even as the curtain went up, was engaging the attention of the English courts. He has not even dis- guised the names to any extent."

The Age said "the taste which leads to the presentation on stage of adaptations of such cases is to be deplored" and called the play a "merely ordinary melodrama, capably played and staged."

Redgrave wrote a number of plays for Anderson.
