= The Squatter's Daughter (1910 film) =

1910 film

- Directed by: Bert Bailey
- Based on: play by Bert Bailey and Edmund Duggan
- Produced by: William Anderson
- Starring: Bert Bailey; Edmund Duggan; Olive Wilton
- Cinematography: Orrie Perry
- Distributed by: Johnson and Gibson
- Release date: 4 August 1910
- Running time: 6,000 feet
- Country: Australia
- Languages: Silent; English intertitles
- Budget: £1,000

The Squatter's Daughter is a 1910 Australian silent film based on the popular play by Bert Bailey and Edmund Duggan. The play was filmed again in 1933.

== Synopsis ==
The plot revolves around the rivalry between two neighboring sheep stations, Enderby and Waratah. This version includes the subplot about the bushranger Ben Hall, which was not used when the play was adapted again in 1933 as the bushranger ban had been introduced.

== Cast ==
- Olive Wilton as Violet Enderby
- Bert Bailey as Archie McPherson
- Edmund Duggan as Ben Hall
- J.H. Nunn as James Harrington
- Rutland Beckett as Dudley Harrington
- George Cross as Tom Bathurst
- George Mackenzie as Nick Harvey
- Temple Harrison as Nulla Nulla
- Edwin Campbell as Billy
- Eugenie Duggan
- Max Clifton

== Production ==
Filming took place in June 1910 with a cast from the acting company of theatre producer William Anderson at the Kings Theatre Melbourne, many of whom had just appeared in The Man from Outback, also by Bailey and Duggan. Theatre star Olive Wilton played the lead role, with Bailey and Duggan in support. One of her leading men, George Cross, later became a casting director for Cinesound Productions.

Shooting took place in Ivanhoe and other surrounding districts of Melbourne entirely outdoors, even for interior scenes. "Under these circumstances, brilliant sunshine was the main factor to be wooed", recalled Olive Wilton. "It seemed impossible to acquire sufficient light without a constant battle against high wind, which made these interior scenes a nightmare, with hair and clothes blowing in all directions."

However, the fact that it was a movie allowed the demonstration of scenes only discussed in the play, such as Nulla escaping the bushranger's cave. Other sequences praised by reviewers included the abduction of the squatter's daughter, the pursuit by Ben Hall and his gang, Ben Hall's last stand, the dash through the cataract, the farm house rope bridge, the waterfall, the shearing match, and a champion stock whip artist. Reportedly over seventy extras were used.

On 7 July 1910, it was announced filming was almost over.

It was advertised as being the most expensive movie ever made in Australia to that date, but this is unlikely.

== Reception ==
Screenings were often accompanied by a lecture.

=== Box office ===
The movie was a popular success at the box office, breaking records in Sydney and Melbourne, and enjoying long runs throughout the country. In November 1910 it was reported that the film "is attracting crowded houses. On Saturday nights the place is hardly large enough to accommodate the crowds."

=== UK release ===
It secured a cinema release in England, marking it as one of the first Australian films to do so. Bert Bailey and Ken G. Hall tried to track down a copy of the movie when Hall directed a version in 1933 but was unsuccessful. No known copies of it exist today, and it is considered a lost film.

=== Critical ===
The Perth Sunday Times called the film a "calamity in celluloid." Another critic called it "a fine example of Australian enterprise, as well as a very interesting and well-arranged picture. The plot is full of exciting incidents and dramatic situations."
