= King's Theatre, Melbourne =

Historical building in Melbourne, Australia

The King's Theatre was a theatre in Melbourne, Australia, located at 133 Russell Street between Bourke Street and Little Collins Street.

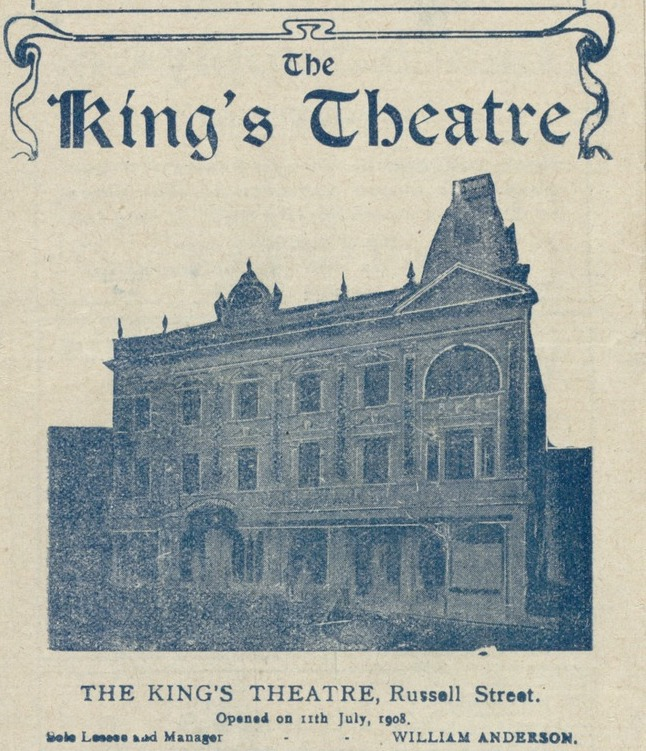
The King's Theatre Melbourne detail from theatre programme

Opening in 1908, the theatre was designed by William Pitt for the theatrical entrepreneur William Anderson.

It was a major live theatre during the first half of the twentieth century, and became a cinema (under the name the Barclay) from the late 1950s until closing in 1976.

== Design and construction ==
The theatre's designer, William Pitt, had already designed a number of Melbourne theatres including the Princess Theatre and Her Majesty's Theatre before working on designs for the Kings Theatre.

William Anderson selected a site (now 131 Russell Street) on Russell Street, near the corner of Bourke Street for the new theatre and construction, employing 200 men, construction took only 5–6 months, beginning after Christmas in 1907. The building featured the use of 2,000,000 bricks, cost 32,000 pounds to construct and included 15 theatre exits that led into streets or laneways in consideration of fire risk. At opening there were 3000 lights in the theatre, and it could seat 2200 people. The theatre also had three sliding roofs, over dome, gallery and stage. At opening, the theatre's colour scheme was blue and gold, with upholstery and seats in blue. The stage was 63 feet wide by 80 feet deep (19 m × 24 m) to allow for large productions and complex scenery/props.

== Opening and early years ==
The King's Theatre, said to be the first new theatre in Melbourne for 20 years, was opened on Saturday 11 July 1908. Victorian State Premier Sir Thomas Bent opened the theatre and other members of parliament were in attendance at the opening performance of Man to Man, a drama which featured Anderson's wife Eugenie Duggan in a leading role, as well as her brother Edmund Duggan.

In the early years, the theatre presented a number of productions by the theatrical company of William Anderson, sole lessee and manager of the theatre. Many of these productions featured Anderson's wife Eugenie Duggan in a leading role. Her brother Edmund Duggan, Olive Wilton and Roy Redgrave also acted in a number of these productions. Other companies such as J. C. Williamson's also put on productions at the theatre.

As well as melodramas and plays, the theatre also presented shows by other acts, such as controversial Canadian dancer Maud Allan, with musicians the Cherniavskys (Mischel, Leo and Jan) and international magicians Le Roy, Talma & Bosco, an act which featured Servais Le Roy, his wife Talma and their colleague Leon Bosco. The theatre had been built to allow for lavish productions in which "live cattle or traps, motor cars etc. may be necessary for the purposes of realism" and the production of the sporting play The Chance of a Lifetime featured Trixy, a trained mare and carriages onstage, while sheep were shorn onstage during the production The Squatter's Daughter.

In 1911 Anderson faced financial ruin due to the failure of his Wonderland City fun fair venture in Sydney. He remained the lessee of Kings Theatre in name only until 1915, but in reality handed over the theatre to the use of Edmund Duggan and Bert Bailey in 1912.

== Later live theatre years ==
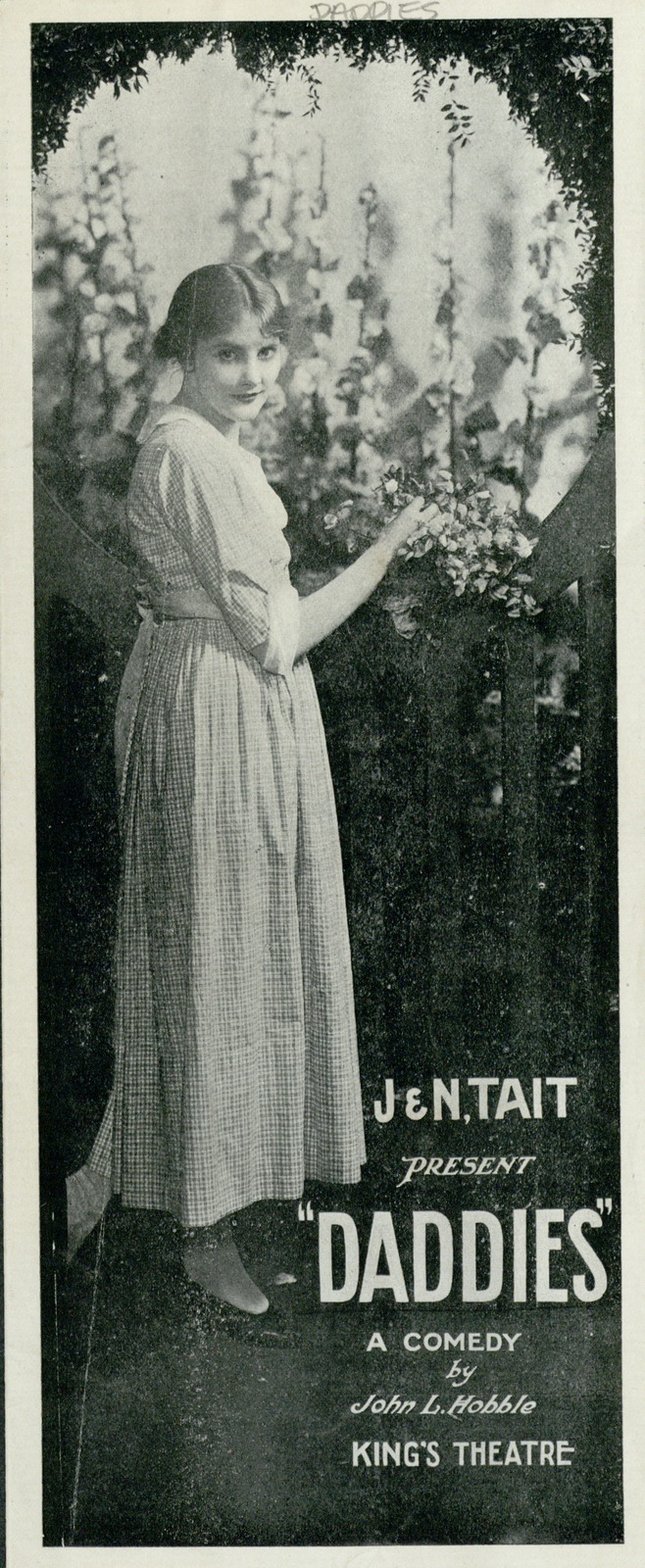
Margaret Nybloc in Daddies at King's Theatre Melbourne (1919)

From 1915 the theatre's lessees were Bert Bailey and Anderson's former business manager, Julius Grant. This period saw a number of productions by J. and N. Tait Ltd, the firm of three of the Tait brothers, John Henry, James Nevin and Frank Samuel, who merged their enterprise with that of J. C. Williamson's in 1920. During the 1920, '30s and '40s, the theatre saw plays, vaudeville, pantomimes (such as Sinbad the Sailor (1939)), comedians, musical revues (like the mostly American production of Olsen and Johnson's Hellzapoppin (1949)), magicians and others perform. In March 1922 the American illusionist Nicola (William Mozart Nicol), who was also giving shows inside the theatre, performed a trick where he hung upside down from a sign that was suspended from the roof of the theatre. He then proceeded to free himself from a strait jacket and handcuffs while in midair. The trick, which was publicised by saying that Nicola would be hanged from the King's Theatre, was in contravention of council by-laws due to the use of 'a lift and tackle' in Russell Street and saw Nicola charged and appear in the district court where he was fined.

== Film screenings and return to live performances ==
1942 saw the temporary end to live performances when film projection equipment was installed by Garnet H. Carroll and Benjamin Fuller's Gaiety Theatres company, who leased the theatre. Warner Brothers screened films at the theatre until 1948.

The following year, Carroll, with partners Aztec Services had the theatre reconverted for live stage productions for sub-lessee, entrepreneur Harry Wren. 1949 saw the Kings Theatre host a season of the controversial Australian play Rusty Bugles, a drama about servicemen by Sumner Locke Elliott, which featured a large degree of swearing.

However a full return to live productions was short lived and in 1951 films were screened there again, as well as stage presentations.

== Barclay Cinema and demolition ==
The interior of the King's Theatre, as well as the façade were remodelled for the owner Norman B. Rydge. The theatre was then renamed the Barclay Theatre or Barclay Cinema. The theatre officially opened in 1958 and the first film shown was Cecil B. DeMille's The Ten Commandments. The last film shown was One Flew Over the Cuckoo's Nest in 1975 and finally in 1977 the theatre was demolished to give way to a multiplex cinema, Greater Union Russell Cinemas, which itself was demolished in 2014.

== Productions ==
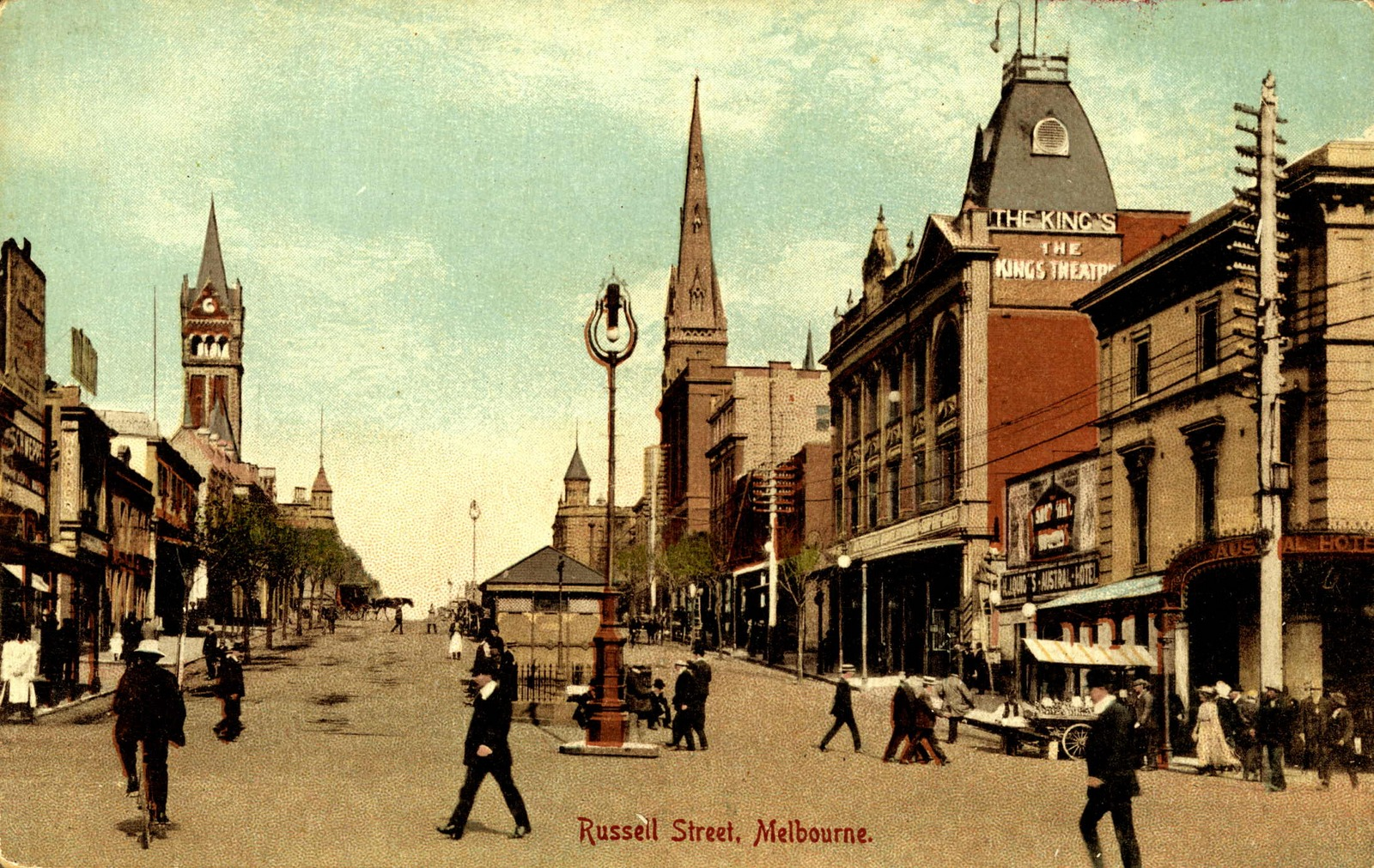
Russell Street, Melbourne, showing King's Theatre on right

Notable productions at the Kings Theatre include:

- 1909: Hamlet, Prince of Denmark
- 1909: The Great Rescue
- 1910: The Chance of a Lifetime
- 1911: The Christian, My Mate, or a Bush Love Story
- 1912: On Our Selection
- 1913: The Land of Nod, A Day at the Races
- 1914: Du Barry, Bunty Pulls the Strings
- 1915: The Confession
- 1916: Hindle Wakes
- 1917: The Merchant of Venice Gran'dad Rudd
- 1918: De Luxe Annie, The Invisible Foe
- 1919: Quinney's, Daddies
- 1920: Il Trovatore
- 1920: F.F.F.
- 1949: Rusty Bugles
- 1950: McCackie Moments
- 1950: The Highwayman
- 1951: See How They Run
