= The Squatter's Daughter =

The Squatter's Daughter may refer to:

- The Squatter's Daughter (play), a 1907 Australian play by Bert Bailey and Edmund Duggan
- The Squatter's Daughter (1910 film), an Australian silent film based on the play
- The Squatter's Daughter (1933 film), an Australian film based on the same play
- The Squatter's Daughter (Lambert), a 1924 painting by George Washington Lambert
