= The Christian (1911 film) =

- Directed by: Franklyn Barrett; Roy Redgrave
- Based on: The Christian by Hall Caine
- Starring: Roy Redgrave; Eugenie Duggan
- Production company: West's Pictures
- Release date: 2 December 1911
- Running time: 3,500 feet
- Country: Australia
- Languages: Silent film; English intertitles

The Christian is a 1911 Australian silent film starring Roy Redgrave and Eugenie Duggan. It was the first film directed by Franklyn Barrett. The film was based on Hall Caine's play adapted from his novel The Christian which was published in 1897 and the first British novel to sell one million copies.

It is considered a lost film.

== Plot ==
Clergyman John Storm is doing mission work in the slums of London when he meets Glory, a girl from the country, who has been persuaded by Lord Robert Ure to seek a career on the stage. Storm tries to persuade Glory not to do it but she refuses. He then asks Lord Ure, which so infuriates him he sends someone to burn down Storm's mission hall. Storm is unconscious inside but he is rescued at the last minute. He goes to see Glory, determined to save her soul, by killing her if need be. But he comes to his senses and the two of them are married.

== Cast ==
- Roy Redgrave as John Storm
- Rutland Beckett as Lord Robert Ure
- Eugenie Duggan as Glory Quayle
- Olive Wilton as Polly Love
- Marie D'Alton as Lady Robert Ure
- Lily Bryer as Mrs James Callender
- Alfred Harford as Lord Storm
- Edmund Duggan as Father Enderby
- Fred Kehoe as Parson Quayle
- Bert Bailey as Archdeacon Wealthy
- George Kensington as Brother Paul
- Max Clifton as Horatio Drake
- Gus Franks as Mr Jupe
- Mabs Howth as Liza

== Production ==
The film is based on a popular play that had been recently been produced in Sydney by William Anderson in September 1911. Roy Redgrave had played the role of John Storm in England for two years prior to coming to Australia.

Indoor scenes were shot at Wonderland in Bondi, which was owned by Anderson.

Shooting also appears to have taken place at West's studios, which were on top of their headquarters in Pitt Street, Sydney.

Roy Redgrave later claimed that he produced the picture:

I had a very strenuous time producing this picture, as I had also to play John Storm, the while I was telling the members who were acting in the scenes what to do. All the time I was doing this I thought that when The Christian was thrown upon the white screen John Storm would be mistaken for a ventriloquist. It turned out to the satisfaction of all concerned.

Redgrave would revive the role on stage throughout the rest of his career.

== Reception ==
The Sydney Morning Herald praised its "splendid results". The Daily Telegraph said:

Eugenie Duggan... succeeded beyond expectation in her work for the camera, giving one of those life-like pictures that are the exception rather than the rule in this connection. And Roy Redgrave... was also a distinct success in his new surroundings, and demonstrated at once that he had caught the spirit of the idea. The work of the cinematographer, Mr. W. Franklyn Barrett, was up to the best traditions of the West, Ltd.. management, the fire scone being a strikingly well- arranged piece of stagecraft. The picture has been declared by experts to be among the best of the class seen in Sydney for some time.

== Later versions ==
There were other film versions of the play in 1914 (from Hollywood), 1915 (from England) and 1923 (from Hollywood).
