= My Mate =

Play written by Edmund Duggan

- Written by: Edmund Duggan
- Original language: English
- Genre: Melodrama

Premiere
- Date premiered: 1911

My Mate, or a Bush Love Story is an Australian play by Edmund Duggan which was first produced in 1911.

== Synopsis ==
Nellie Moreland returns to her family's farm after being away at school in Sydney for half a dozen years. Two best friends are in love with her, Jack Melton and Jim Fernleigh, as well as the villainous Ralph Seymour. Jim declares his love for Nellie but she tells him he will only ever be like a brother to her – her heart belongs to Jack. This causes trouble between Jack and Jim. Ralph kidnaps Nellie and Jack comes to her rescue; Ralph is about to stab Jack dead with a knife but Jim shoots Ralph dead. Jim is arrested for murder, but eventually escapes from gaol. The Moreland family are in financial crisis because of the evil Cashman, who holds a bill of sale over the property, but Jim rides a horse to victory in Melbourne and the family's fortunes are restored. Comic relief is provided by Dolf Darling.

== Production ==
The play was first produced at Kings Theatre in Melbourne under the management of Duggan's brother-in-law, William Anderson with a cast that included Duggan, Bailey and Roy Redgrave. It featured readings from Adam Lindsay Gordon, of whom Duggan was a great admirer

=== Original cast ===
- Roy Redgrave as Jack Melton
- Larry Sweeney as Jim Fernleigh
- Bert Bailey as Dolf Darling
- Rutland Beckett as Ralph Seymour
- Edmund Duggan as Joe Moreland
- J. H. Nunn as Sergeant Haynes
- Temple Harrison as Trooper Wilkins
- Max Clifton as Gunyah
- Edwin Campbell as Alex Cashman
- Fred Kehoe as Larry Lindsay
- Frank Nosemore as Charlie Summers
- William Muskett as Shoak Bill
- Lillie Bryer as Mrs. Moreland
- Olive Wilton as Jessie Moreland,
- Marie Wllbert as Janet McTavish
- Nellie Brancy as Maud Wilson
- Maud Goldspink as Annie Wilson
- Eugenie Duggan as Nellie Morland

== Reception ==
The play did not enjoy the same popularity earned by Duggan's collaborations with Bert Bailey, such as On Our Selection (1912). However it still toured around Australia and was revived several times, including productions in 1915, 1919 and 1925

== See also ==
- 1911 in Australian literature
