= The Prince and the Beggar Maid (play) =

Four act play

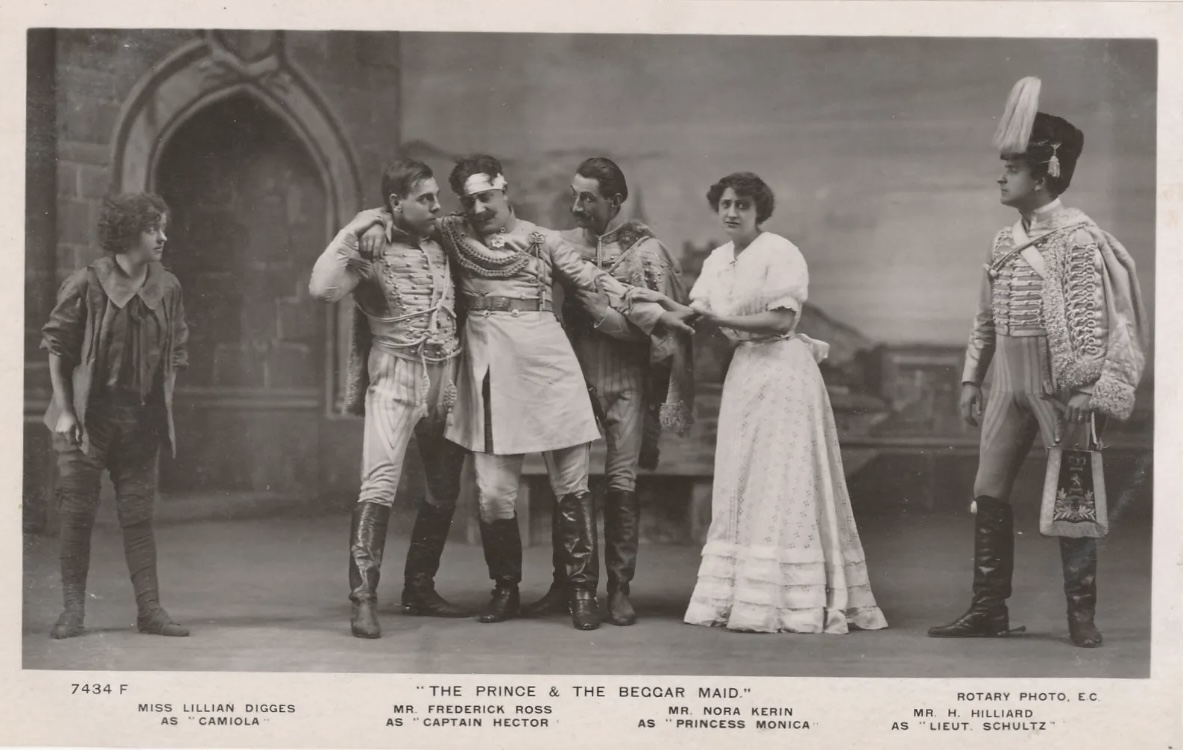
A scene from The Prince and the Beggar Maid at the Lyceum Theatre in London (1908)

The Prince and the Beggar Maid is a romantic drama in four Acts and ten scenes by Walter Howard.

The production opened at the Lyceum Theatre in London on 6 June 1908 and ran for 82 performances. It had another short run of 19 performances in a revival at the Lyceum in April and May 1910. The drama was equally successful in Australia and New Zealand, playing, among other venues, at the Criterion Theatre in Sydney, Australia in December 1910 where it was produced by William Anderson.

== Production ==
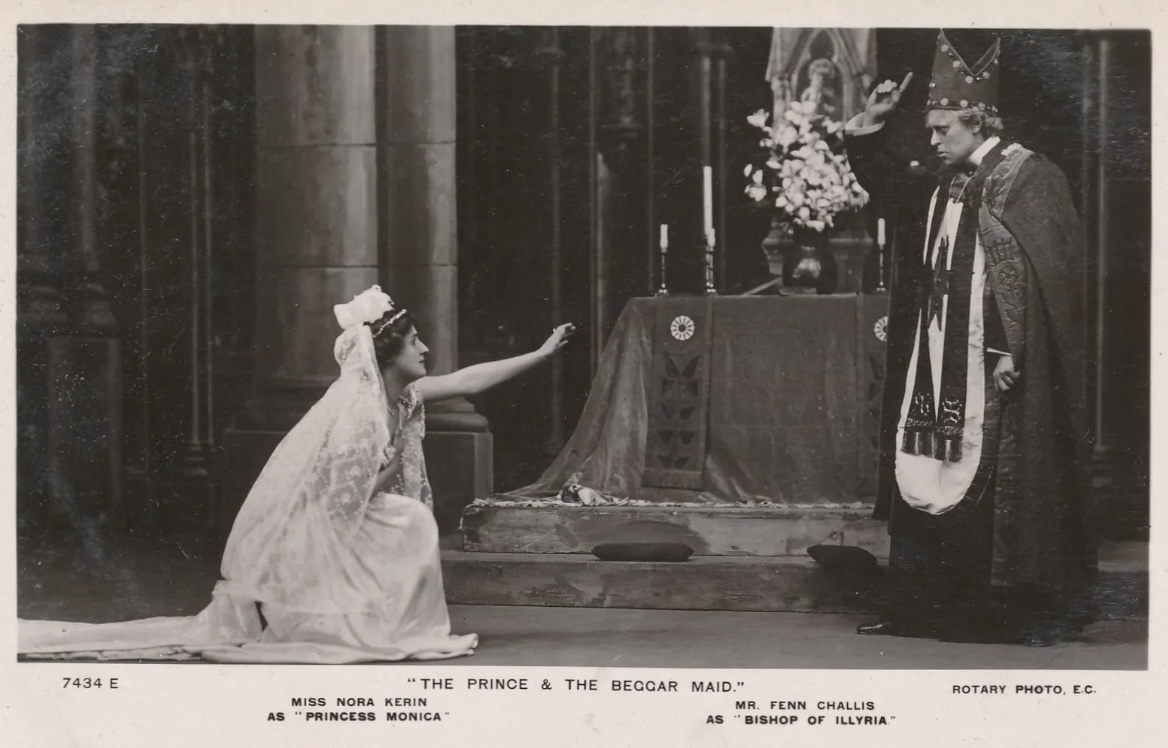
A scene from the 1908 Lyceum Theatre production

The Prince and the Beggar Maid deals with the mimic pomp, intrigues, wars, and petty tyrannies of those ducal States and little kingdoms which Anthony Hope resorted to when he placed The Prisoner of Zenda in an imaginary Ruritania. Gorgeous uniforms, dazzling interiors, and the martial display dear to the heart of the playgoer, marked the progress of the new piece, which had been handsomely put on, with some picturesque sets by Mr. Rege Robins. The best tableau this artist had hitherto painted showed the interior of the Cathedral of Illyria, with its pointed arches, richly stained glass, and decorated altar, before which the choristers swimg their censers, whilst the Bishop endeavoured to bring to a close a marriage ceremony, which was tragically interrupted. The battlements of the Palace, with a beautiful view of the Bay of Illyria, and the banqueting hair at the Castle of Wellenberg, with stately windows occupyied the full width of a noble interior, and won the applause of the crowded house.

Incidental music was composed by Raimund Pechotsch. During the Lyceum Theatre production in London a special performance was given before Queen Alexandra. In Melbourne, Australia it was performed before his Excellency Lord Dudley, the Governor General, and Georgina, Countess of Dudley.

== Synopsis ==
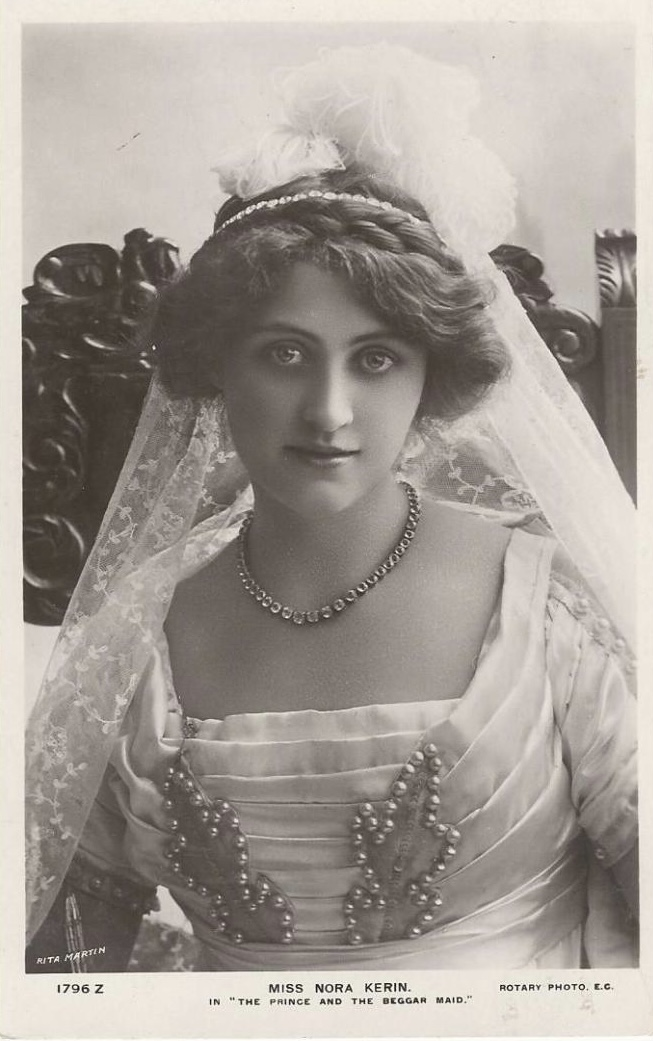
Nora Kerin as Princess Monica in the Lyceum Theatre production (1908)

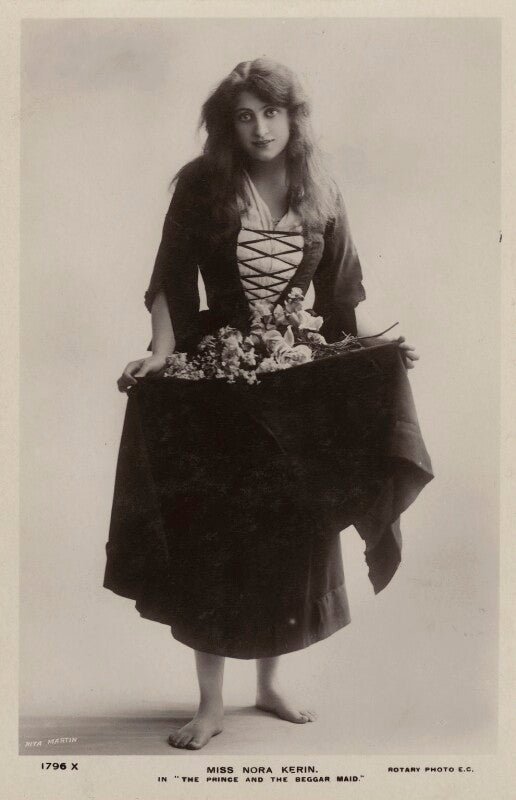
Nora Kerin as the Beggar Maid in the Lyceum Theatre production (1908)

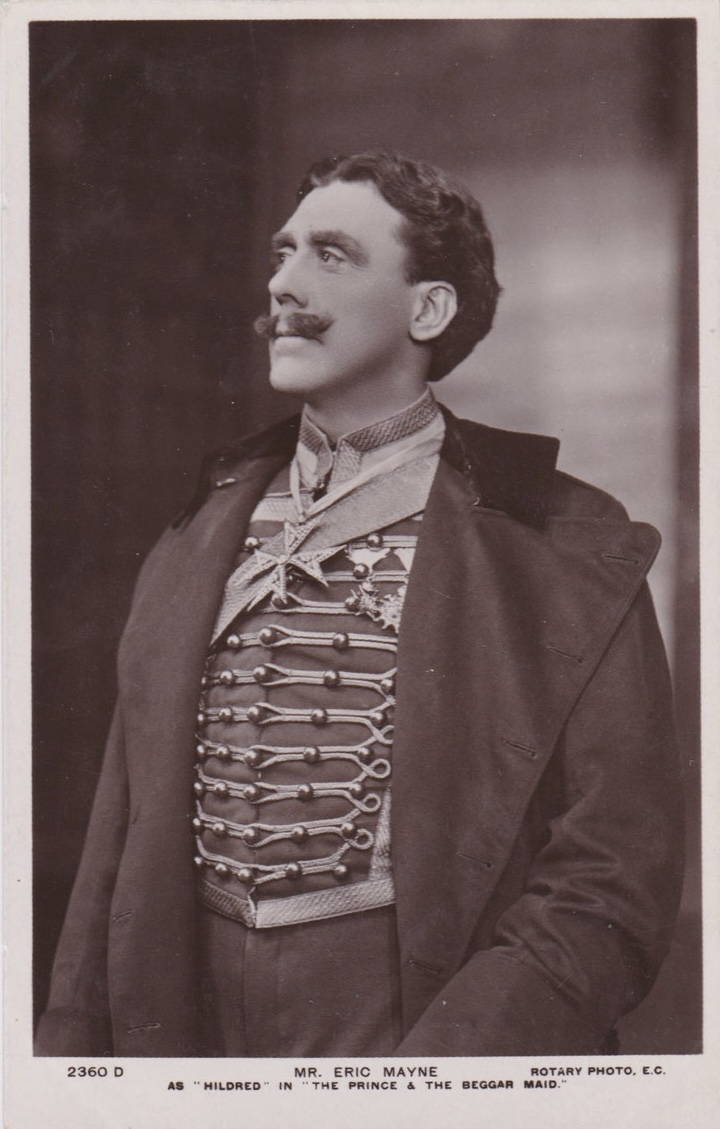
Eric Mayne as Prince Hildred in the Lyceum Theatre production (1908)

Monica is a Princess of Illyria. Her small State is under attack from Prince Hildred of Sylvania, the nominal dispute being a contested strip of territory, but the real reason is her refusal to become his bride. Monica, disguised as a beggar maid, visits the enemy's castle of Wellenberg, in order to make sure that the hatred of her schoolgirl days for Prince Hildred still exists, and in that way tells his fortune, and that of his half-brothers, the crippled Prince Michael and the handsome Prince Olaf, over the mess-table of the Royal Guard. In this scene the audacious gipsy falls in love with Olaf, and, leading him to a polished breast-plate, bids him see there the face of the man who stands at tho open door of the Princess Monica's heart. Suddenly, Prince Hildred divines her identity and orders her arrest as a spy, but the flashing sword of Olaf is between her and the reigning prince, and he escorts her from the castle.

In the second act the Sylvanians have captured the Palace of Illyria, in which Monica is a prisoner in charge of Prince Olaf. The unscrupulous Bishop of Illyria sides with the invader in the hope of a cardinalate, and endeavours to persuade Monica to put an end to the prevailing misery of the inhabitants by accepting Prince Hlldred, and the latter, upon contemptuous refusal once more, traps Princess Monica into taking an oath before the Bishop that she "will marry any man of rank equal to her own, except Hildred, provided that such contract shall terminate the war." But, to her dismay, instead of uniting her with Olaf, Prince Hildred forces upon her the hunchbacked Michael, who also is heart and soul in love with her and who is determined to take advantage of Monica's vow. Michael ignores the pleas of his brother Prince Olaf to release Monica from her vow. Olaf uses his influence with the army to seize and kidnap Michael in order to prevent the marriage. However, Hildred and his forces rescue Michael and take him to the wedding ceremony at the Cathedral in Illyria. It is only at the last minute during the wedding ceremony that Michael himself saved the situation when he declared "I will not" instead of "I will", thus ending the third act.

During Act Four Hildred is disposed of by being dropped over the battlements of Illyria onto the streets below by Nathan, a dumb retainer of Michael, avenging the horse-whipping of his master. The subplot is resolved when Camiola, the beggar maid, disguised as a beggar boy, has watched over the woman-hating Captain Hector, of Monica's bodyguard, and also joins in matrimony Hector's giddy sister Viola and his lively lieutenant, Karl Stromberg.

== Synopsis of Scenes and Events ==
- Act I:

Scene 1- Interior of the Palace of Illyria.
Scene 2- Great Hall in the Castle of Welllenburg.

- Act II:

Scene - Battlements Overlooking the Bay of Illyria.

- Act III:

Scene 1- Interior of the Palace at Illyria.
Scene 2- A Ruined Turret Chamber in the Red Schloss.
Scene 3- Outside the City Wall.
Scene 4- Interior of the Cathedral.

- Act IV:

Scene- The Battlements of the Palace.

== Cast ==
Role	Lyceum Theatre, London 1908	Australia 1910	Lyceum Theatre, London 1910
Princess Monica	Nora Kerin	Eugenie Duggan	Annie Saker
Prince Olaf	Lauderdale Maitland	George Cross	Godfrey Tearle
Prince Hildred	Eric Mayne	Rutland Beckett	Eric Mayne
Prince Michael	Halliwell Hobbes	Roy Redgrave	Halliwell Hobbes
Captain Hector	Frederick Ross	Edward Duggan	Frederick Ross
Bishop of Illyria	Fenn Challis	Sterling Whyte	Cowley Wright
Viola	Miss Drake	Fanny Errls	Maxine Hinton
Karl Stromberg	Reginald Sheldrick	Bert Bailey	Hastings Lynn
Camiola	Lillian Digges	Olive Wilton	Ethel Patrick
Nathan	Herbert Dansey	Unknown	Arthur Poole
Lt. Schulz	Harry Hilliard	Unknown	Henry Armstrong
Colonel Wellenburg	Unknown	Max Clifton	S. Major Jones
Captain Schwarz			Sidney Vautier
Captain Karsburg			Herbert Lester
Captain Sudermann			Henry Pollard
Lieutenant Welder			J. R. Gillespie

== Production history ==
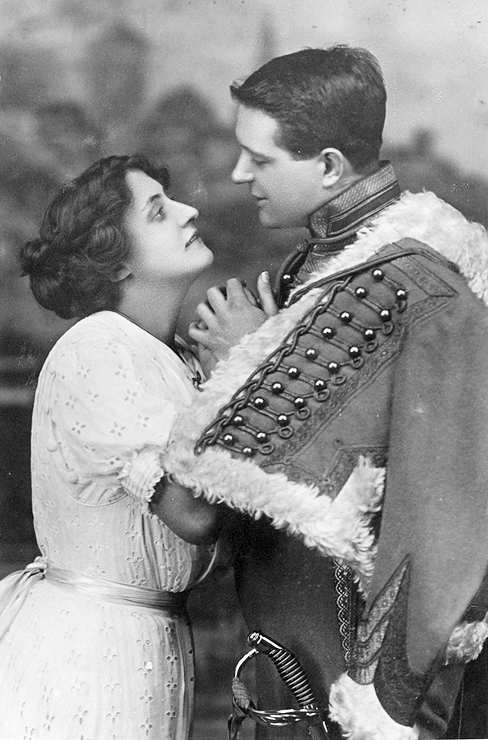
Nora Kerin as Princess Monica and Lauderdale Maitland as Prince Olaf in the Lyceum Theatre production (1908)

The drama was produced at the Grand Theatre, Southampton from 1908 to 1909, and again from 1909 to 1910. It also toured extensively in Australia and New Zealand during 1910 to 1911 produced by William Anderson.

The play was also made into two films: The Prince and the Beggar Maid (1910), and The Prince and the Beggarmaid (1921), with Henry Ainley as Prince Olaf and Kathleen Vaughan as Princess Monika. During 1927 and 1935 Tod Slaughter toured the provinces of the United Kingdom with his own company in which he played Prince Olaf.
