= The Squatter's Daughter (1933 film) =

- Directed by: Ken G. Hall
- Written by: Gayne Dexter; E. V. Timms
- Based on: play by Bert Bailey & Edmund Duggan
- Produced by: Ken G. Hall
- Starring: Jocelyn Howarth; Grant Lyndsay
- Cinematography: Frank Hurley; George Malcolm
- Edited by: George Malcolm; William Shepherd
- Music by: Frank Chapple; Tom King
- Production company: Cinesound Productions
- Release date: 29 September 1933 (Australia)
- Running time: 104 mins (Australia); 90 mins (England)
- Country: Australia
- Language: English
- Budget: £16,000 or £11,000
- Box office: £35,000 or £28,000 £7,500 (UK)

The Squatter's Daughter is a 1933 Australian melodrama directed by Ken G. Hall and starring Jocelyn Howarth. One of the most popular Australian films of the 1930s, it is based on a 1907 play by Bert Bailey and Edmund Duggan which had been previously adapted to the screen in 1910. The film was Hall's third feature as director and was a considerable commercial success.

== Plot ==
Joan Enderby runs her family sheep station but is about to lose it because she can't afford to buy the lease from the Sherringtons, who run the neighbouring station, Waratah. While Ironbark Sherrington has been away in London looking for a cure to save his sight, his son Clive and overseer, Fletcher have planned to bankrupt Enderby station. Joan is helped by a mysterious newcomer, Wayne Ridgeway, who is actually the rightful heir to the Sherrington estate.

There is a subplot about Joan's crippled brother Jimmy, who is in love with Zena, daughter of Jebal Zim, an Afghan trader. When Zim tries to tell Ironbark that Ridgeway is the true heir, Fletcher kills him and abducts Zena. Joan and Ridgeway manage to fight a bushfire that threatens Enderby, deliver sheep, rescue Zena and capture Fletcher.

== Cast ==
- Jocelyn Howarth as Joan Enderby
- Grant Lyndsay as Wayne Ridgeway
- John Warwick as Clive Sherrington
- Fred MacDonald as shearer
- W. Lane-Bayliff as Old Ironbark
- Dorothy Dunckley as Miss Ramsbottom
- Owen Ainley as Jimmy
- Cathleen Esler as Zena
- George Cross
- Claude Turton as Jebal Zim
- George Lloyd as Shearer
- Les Warton as Fletcher
- Katie Towers as Poppy

== Production ==
The film has been described as "part of an Australian subgenre, the outdoors colonial melodrama... stories set on outback stations featuring unscrupulous farmers, heroic foremen, upper class twits visiting from England, family secrets and feisty horse-riding heroines. The latter formed the "squatter’s daughter" archetype – the brave, beautiful farm girl who galloped away from bushfires – and meant female starring roles were often stronger in Australian rather than American westerns. "

=== Scripting ===
Cinesound had originally intended to follow up their successful first feature, On Our Selection (1932) with an adaptation of The Silence of Dean Maitland. However they had difficulty finding appropriate actors to play the leads and instead decided to adapt the 1907 play The Squatter's Daughter, which had previously been filmed in 1910.

By December 1932 director Ken G. Hall had hired novelist E. V. Timms to work on him with the adaptation.

However Hall was not happy with the result, so he brought on his old boss, Gayne Dexter, to do a rewrite. A novelisation of the script by Charles Melaun was published in 1933. The adaptation made a number of changes from the play, including making the story contemporary, removing comic Aboriginal servants and a plot about bushrangers (due to the bushranger ban).

=== Casting ===
Jocelyn Howarth was a discovery of director Ken G. Hall. She moved to Hollywood and had a career under the name "Constance Worth". She was paid £6 a week.

Grant Lyndsay had previously played the romantic lead in On Our Selection (1932).

=== Filming ===
Shooting commenced February 1932 at Cinesound's studio in Bondi and on location at Goonoo Goonoo station near Tamworth. The bushfire finale was filmed near Wallacia, west of Sydney. During this sequence, the crew placed old nitrate film amongst the trees for the fire to burn more fiercely. It resulted in extra high flames, although Grant Lyndsay hurt his hand diving into a pool, and Ken Hall and Frank Hurley were singed. Jocelyn Howarth was also injured during the making of the movie.

Filming was scheduled to take ten weeks but because of poor weather it ended up taking eighteen. There was additional filming on board a ship a number of months later.

== Reception ==
=== Box office ===
Australian reviews were generally positive and the movie was successful at the box office. By the end of 1934 it had earned an estimated profit of £5,900 and by the end of 1935 it had grossed over £25,000 in Australia and New Zealand.

In 1952 Hall estimated the film had earned just under £50,000.

=== UK Release ===
UK distribution rights were bought by MGM for £7,500; the film was released there under the title Down Under.

=== Critical ===
Filmink argued the film "is hokey and betrays the inexperience of its makers... The pacing throughout the movie is slow and the acting awkward" but felt "It looks fantastic" with "great action scenes" and an effective performance by Howarth.

== Tall Timbers ==
It has been argued Hall's later Tall Timbers re used many of the tropes of The Squatter's Daughter. It has also been argued the film influenced Rangle River (1936).
