= Australian Bushland Symphony =

- Directed by: Ken G. Hall
- Produced by: Ken G. Hall
- Production company: Cinesound Productions
- Release date: 1949
- Country: Australia
- Language: English

Australian Bushland Symphony is a 1949 documentary directed by Academy award-winning documentarian Ken G. Hall. The documentary presents a study of the native birds and animals inhabiting Australia, in their natural state.

Hall had previously used the concept of a "bushland symphony" in his 1932 film, On Our Selection.

The film was sold to US television. The documentary is also referred to as "Bushland Symphony".
