= Edmund Duggan =

Edmund Duggan may refer to:

- Eamonn Duggan (1878–1936) or Edmund S. Duggan, Irish lawyer, nationalist and politician
- Edmund Duggan (playwright) (1862–1938), Irish-born actor and playwright who worked in Australia
