= The Native Born =

Play written by Bert Bailey and Edmund Duggan

- Poster from original production
- Original language: English
- Written by: Bert Bailey; Edmund Duggan
- Genre: Melodrama
- Setting: The region near Mount Kosciuszko

Premiere
- Date: 8 February 1913
- Place: Theatre Royal, Hobart

The Native Born is an Australian play written by Bert Bailey and Edmund Duggan under the name of Albert Edmunds. It was first produced in 1913 by Bailey's own company.

== Synopsis ==
The plot is set in the region near Mount Kosciuszko during the early days of European settlement of New South Wales. Neal Blackmore, a land speculator, discovers a gold deposit on the property owned by selector John Hillgrove and tries to get his hands on it. Blackmore desires Lily Armidale, who is in love with Hillgrove's son Jack - who is loved in turn by Blackmore's sister, Alma. The Blackmores henchman Solly Steele uses a loaded whip to kill an old fossicker called Kosciusko Joe, who also knows about the gold deposit, and frames Jack Hillgrove for the murder.

Comic relief is provided by Miss Cruikshank, Lily's man-hating maiden aunt; a magician called Charles Spinnifex (who falls for Hillgrove's daughter Cissie) and his assistant Willie Staggers; and a Scottish policeman.

During one scene, Spinnifex's magic abilities allow Jack to escape the villains; in another, they enable the heroes to play upon the superstitions of the Blackmore henchman, Barcoo. The climax involves Jack rescuing Lily from Blackmore's henchmen during a snow storm.

== Background ==
The play was written by August 1912. It was inspired by the success of the author's earlier The Squatter's Daughter and The Man from Outback.

== Reception ==
The Hobart Mercury said "the play is a very original work, with a well sustained plot and a pretty love story."

The Sydney Morning Herald said "comedy, smart dialogue, and dramatic effect are judiciously interwoven."

They play was popular, although not as much as Bailey and Duggan's earlier collaboration, On Our Selection.

== Original cast ==
- Bert Bailey as Charles Spinnifex
- Alfreda Bevan as Miss Cruikshank
- Mary Marlow as Lily Armidale
- George Treloar as Neal Blackmore
- Lilias Adoson as Alma Blackmore
- Edmund Duggan as John Hillgrove
- Alred Harford as Constable Finegan
- Guy Hastings as Jack Hillgrove
- Laura Roberts as Cisse Hillgrove
- Fred MacDonald as Willie Staggers
- George Kensington as Solly Steele
- Arthur Betram as Kosciusko Joe
- J K Lennon as Barcoo
