= The Man from Outback =

1909 Australian play by Bert Bailey and Edmund Duggan

- Poster from 1909 production in Tasmania
- Original language: English
- Written by: Bert Bailey; Edmund Duggan
- Genre: Melodrama

Premiere
- Date: 1909

The Man from Outback is a 1909 Australian play by Bert Bailey and Edmund Duggan written under the name of 'Albert Edmunds'.

== Synopsis ==
Panimbla Station in the Australian outback is owned by Stephen Maitland, who is unaware that his manager is in league with a gang of cattle duffers. He is helped by his feisty daughter Mona and a mysterious stranger, Dave Goulburn.

== Production ==
The play was clearly inspired by an earlier success of Bailey and Duggan, The Squatter's Daughter, or, The Land of the Wattle (1907). It was a success on the stage, with the part of Dave Goulburn played by Roy Redgrave. The original production was produced by William Anderson.
