= Dick Fair =

Australian actor (1907–1982)

- Born: Richard Edward Fair; 17 November 1907; Mosman, New South Wales, Australia
- Died: 20 July 1982 (aged 74); Normanhurst, New South Wales, Australia
- Other name: Grant Lyndsay
- Education: Andrew McCann Acting School
- Occupations: Actor; radio compere; producer; voice over
- Years active: 1926-early 1970s

Richard Edward Fair (17 November 1907 – 20 July 1982) was an Australian actor of stage and screen and radio compere and producer, who also did voice.over. He is best known for hosting the radio shows Australia's Amateur Hour and 'Australia's Hour of Song', a community singing hour with guest performers. He occasionally acted under the name Grant Lyndsay.

== Biography ==
=== Early life and study ===
Fair was born in Mosman, New South Wales, to Richard Edward Fair Snr, Canadian-born contractor and his second wife Emily Gertrude Kennedy, from Victoria, he attended St. Aloysius College and St.Ignatius College, and studied voice production and attending Andrew McCann's acting school

=== Stage and film ===
Fair made his stage debut in a production of The Terror aged 19, and worked for numerous theatre companie's including Maurice Moscovitch Company, and J.C. Williamson Ltd. and toured with Bert Bailey in The Patsy

He appeared in several film roles including the Ken Hall produced On Our Selection and The Squatter's Daughter. His performance in Squatter's Daughter was described as "very wet, like a lot of Australian leading men in movies around this time."

=== Radio compere and entertainer ===
Fair commenced a successful run in radio, from 1935, with a breakfast program at 2SM, before joining rival station 2GB in 1937 and singing on The Jack Davey Show, consequently released from his contract, he was signed to host both the Lux Radio Theatre and Australia Amateur Hour, both first at 2UE then at 2UW, the program that had started as a Sydney-based program, soon. went nationwide broadcast to capital cities, he would take over as a producer of the latter, when his co-star Harry Dearth was drafted in the Air Force, Dearth returning to the program in 1946 and finding the travel arduous, he resigned in 1950. In 1952, the returned to radio 2UEto host the equally successful Australia's Hour of Song, that was broadcast over 49 nine stations the program would feature singers including Peter Dawson and Gladys Moncrieff, he worked as an announcer of serials, commercials, and various chat. He went freelance as a producer in 1960, working at 2CH for some ten years, after which he returned to 2GB for a late night music program.

=== Personal life ===
Fair married Agnes Margaret McLeod on 23 September 1933, at St. Mary's Basilica with Catholic rites.

He was involved in a court case, by his landlady in 1958, who sought that he be evicted from her Vaucluse home, under the grounds of being frequently drunk and disorderly, twice setting fire to bedding and playing music late at night on full volume. He won the case and remained in the apartment until 1963. For most of his life, Fair had resided in the Eastern Suburbs, moving into a nursing home in Normanhurst, New South Wales 1974, where he died on 20 July 1982.

== Filmography ==
Year	Title	Role	Notes
1932	On Our Selection	Sandy	
1933	The Squatter's Daughter	billed under the stage name "Grant Lyndsay"	
1970	Tora! Tora! Tora!	Lt. Col. Carrol A. Powell, Radar Officer	Uncredited
