= George Cross (actor) =

Australian actor and casting director (c.1873–1949)

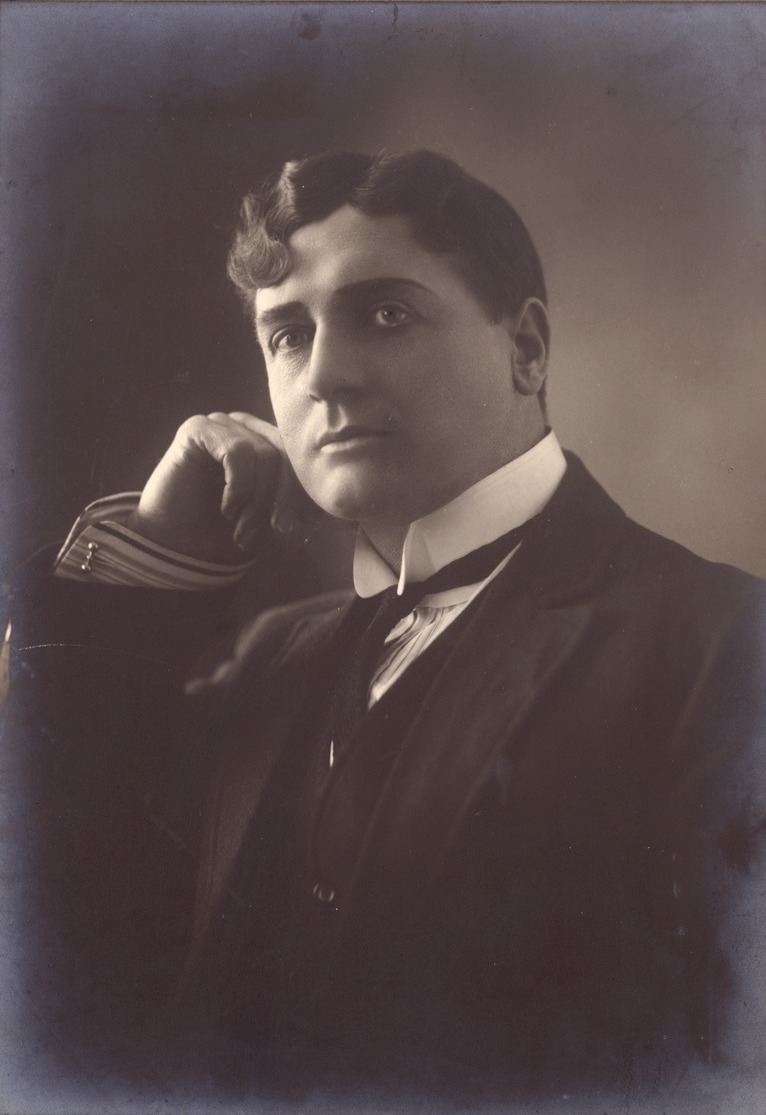
Mr George W Cross leading man in the George Willoughby Company at The Theatre Royal in The Ever Open Door H8383

George W. Cross (c. 1873 - 12 August 1949) was an Australian actor and casting director. For many years he was a leading actor, producer and director on stage, including a stint in San Francisco.

He first came to Australia around the turn of the 20th century and at one time managed stage actress Nellie Bramley. In 1910 he played Prince Olaf in The Prince and the Beggar Maid in a tour of Australia. In the 1930s, he was in charge of casting at Cinesound Productions where his discoveries included Jocelyn Howarth and Shirley Ann Richards.

In 1943 he was theatre manager at the Strand in Hobart.

== Selected credits ==
- The Squatter's Daughter (1907) (play) – actor
- The Squatter's Daughter (1910) – actor
- The Ever Open Door (1914) - actor
- The Mutiny of the Bounty (1916) – actor (as Captain Bligh)
