= Annie Saker =

English actress

Annie Saker (13 March 1882 – 8 October 1932) was an English actor.

Annie Elizabeth Laura Mortimer was born in Edinburgh, daughter of Maria Saker (an actor) and granddaughter of Horatio Saker. Her debut on the stage was at age eleven in Herbert Beerbohm Tree's production of G. Stuart Ogilvie's Hypatia at the Haymarket Theatre in 1893. She later appeared under the management of Charles Wyndham in Under the Red Robe.

After a tour playing in comedies of the period such as Pink Dominoes, Betsy, and The Great Divorce Case, Saker became established as a leading lady of melodrama. Among the plays she starred in were The Prince and the Beggar Maid (1910), The Soldier Princess, and The Silver Crucifix.

Saker appeared in at least one film, The Lifeguardsman, directed by Frank G Bayley (1916).

In 1927-29 she toured Australia with Dion Boucicault and Irene Vanbrugh, appearing in pieces such as Caroline, The Letter, and The Notorious Mrs. Ebbsmith.

Annie never married. She died in Leigh-on-Sea on 8 October 1932 at the early age of 50.
