= Minnie Tittell Brune =

Actress (1875–1974)

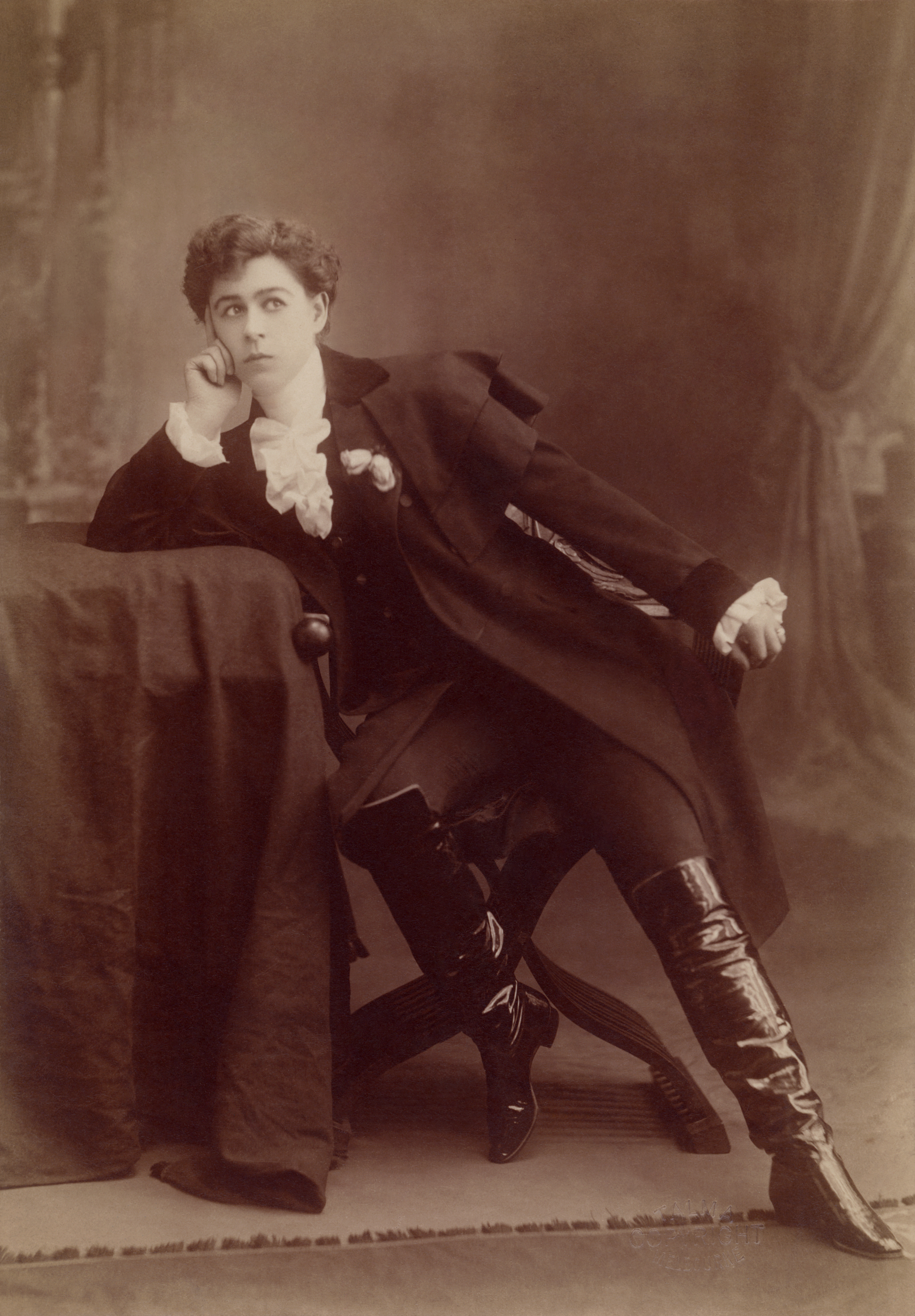
- Minnie Tittell Brune as the Duke of Reichstadt in Edmond Rostand's play L'Aiglon.
- Born: Minnie Tittle; 1875; San Francisco, California, US
- Died: September 1974 (aged 98–99); Los Angeles, California, US
- Other name: Fanny Tittell-Brune
- Occupation: Actress
- Spouse: Clarence Marion Brune (né Browne)

Minnie Tittell Brune (1875–1974) was an American actress. Although little known in her own country, she became a major figure in the history of the Australian stage, achieving the peak of her career during an Antipodean tour from 1904 to 1909. She is also notable for being the only known link between two notable acting families of different centuries, having worked in 19th-century America with Junius Brutus Booth Jr. of the Booth family, and in 20th century Australia with Roy Redgrave, founder of the Redgrave family. Although having no previous family acting background, Minnie's own two sisters Esther and Charlotte also pursued careers on the stage.

Married by 1899 to Clarence Marion Brune (né Browne) (1867–1935), an adventurous attorney from whom she took her stage name, the couple were immediately sued repeatedly in the state of Washington for land speculation fraud and legal scandals continued to dog her husband in Australia. Despite this they remained together until his death. With a strong religious upbringing, Minnie took her Catholic faith seriously and was often conflicted about her roles as a Catholic and an actress, describing herself in one Australian interview as "half a nun". Upon retirement or widowhood, the "nun" half came to the fore, and she was living in relative obscurity as a member of the Order of St Francis in Los Angeles, California when she died in September 1974 at the age of 99.

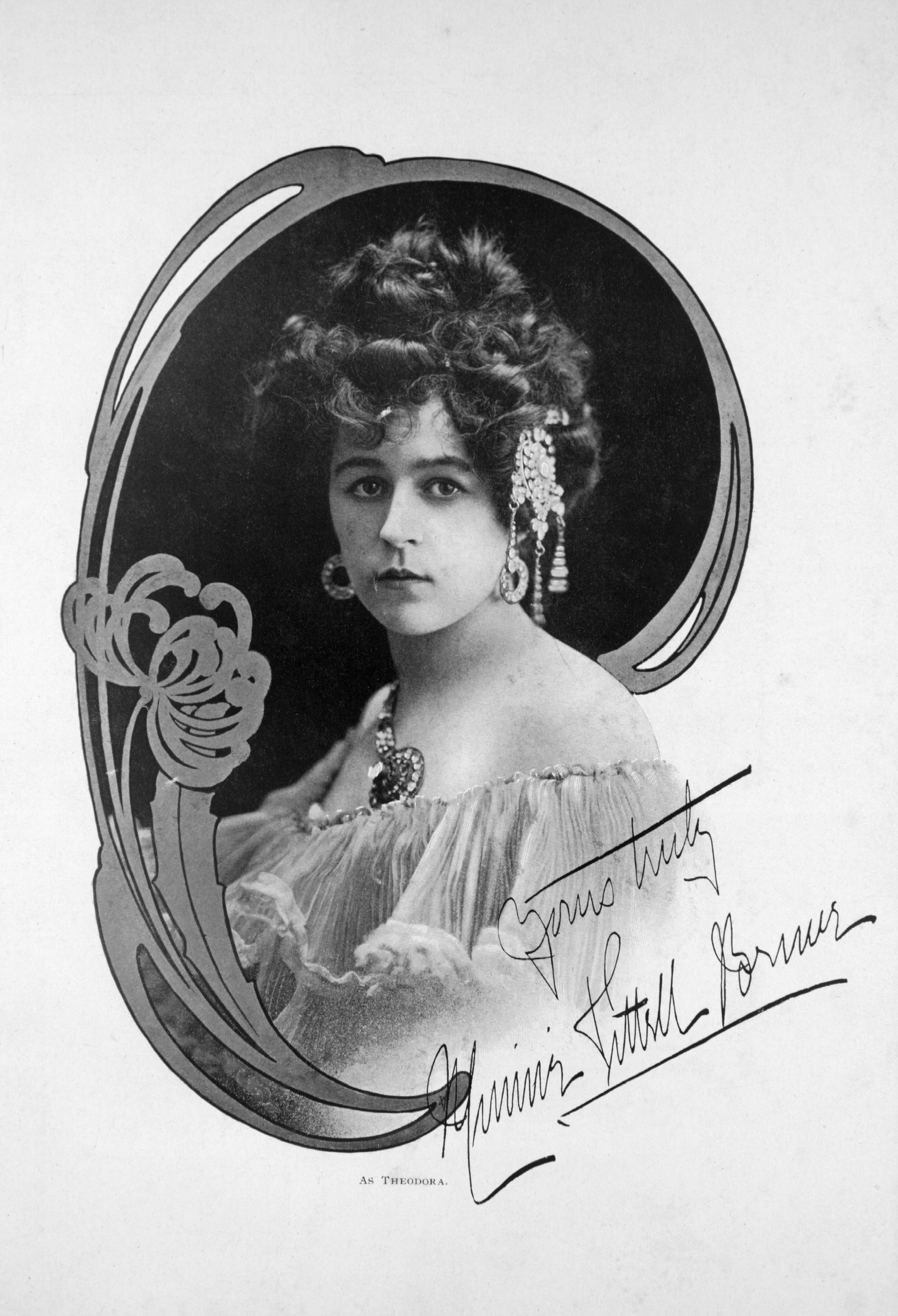
J C Williamson Co -Miss Tittell Brune souvenir. (Inside front page. 1905).

== Early life ==
Minnie Tittell Brune was born Minnie Tittle in 1875 in San Francisco, where her mother Minna Esther St Marie kept a lodging house. She had two elder sisters: Esther, also an actress who became a "crack shot and expert stage swordswoman" and performed in at least one silent film before her death in 1934; and Charlotte, who married a theatrical manager. She also had family who were nuns.

Minnie made her first stage appearance as a child of four and a half when she played Little Jim in Lights of London at the California Theatre of her home town. After her childhood appearances on stage, she was placed in a convent for about a year, perhaps in a parental attempt to discourage her from a career in theatre. Working as a child actor, she went on tour for producer Charles Frohman, appearing in New York in The Girl I left Behind and touring the United States with actors such as Junius Brutus Booth Jr. and Frederick Warde.

== Husband Clarence Marion Brune ==
Minnie's husband, Clarence Marion Brune (born Clarence Marion Browne), was an attorney and a theatre producer who earned several degrees from such universities as Harvard, Wesleyan, Université Laval (Quebec), University of Chicago Law School, Catholic University of America and Columbia College (New York City). Clarence was also the author of works on topics such as Modern Theatre, Greek Tragedy, Shakespearean Legal Terminology, the Romantic Movement, and English Poetry.

It is recorded that she appeared with her husband Clarence (whose name she took) in a revival of Sardou's Theodora at the Grand Opera House, New York in 1901 and they toured together continuously in the United States for nearly a decade before leaving for Australia in 1904. But it was only in the Antipodes that she made a huge name for herself.

== Australia 1904–1909 ==
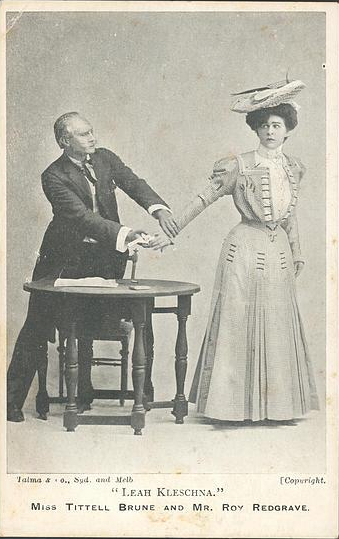
Roy Redgrave and Miss Tittell Brune appearing in Leah Kleschna circa 1907

She was brought to Australia by J. C. Williamson, who is said to have met her while she was on her honeymoon in Europe. It was not until 1904 that he persuaded Minnie to make the voyage from California to Australia. The ship on which she and her husband travelled, The Australia, ran aground in Port Phillip Bay in June 1904. Minnie was unhurt, but she took a philosophical view of such incidents. She later told an interviewer "I was not alarmed about the wreck, though I fully realised the danger of it. If it was to have been that I should be drowned – well, that’s all about it. It would have happened so. As it was ordained otherwise, here I am!"

She made her first appearance in Sydney on Saturday, September 21, 1904, in the play Sunday, a Story of Western Life at Her Majesty's Theatre. Minnie played Sunday, "the whole-hearted lovable girl at a miners camp." She was supported by Roy Redgrave and Gaston Mervale. The performance was a huge success and led to her becoming one of the most popular actresses on the Australian and New Zealand stage. She received lyrical reviews for her performance as "Peter Pan" in the play's first season in Australia in 1908, produced by J. C. Williamson. She was by then 29 years of age and a devout Catholic, a non-smoker and teetotaller, and often quoted the Bible in press interviews. One magazine quoted her as saying:

I’m an actress…but I’m also religious; I can’t help it. I can justify my actress self to my religious self: but I can’t justify the things that you can’t separate from the actress, the publicity, the feeling of being considered public property even off the stage. I hate that. I don’t like when I walk down the street, to have men looking at me and speculating about me. I hate to hear them say, "That’s Tittell Brune" and I feel their eyes boring into my back when I’m past. It makes me feel common and I loathe it. If I can’t disguise myself I’ve got to put up with it. But that kind of publicity revolts me. It really does, because I am religious – I’m half a nun.

== Later career ==
Minnie Tittell Brune’s five-year sojourn in Australia ended in 1909. She decided to try her luck in London but met with limited success. She received only mediocre reviews in her first piece, The Eternal Question at the Garrick Theatre. Her work in 1910 included Dr Jekyll and Mr Hyde at the Queen's Theatre opposite H.B. Irving, Sir Henry Irving's surviving son, and as the chorus in Henry V.

Minnie had few London appearances in 1911, her major role being in a play called The Woman on the Case at the Coronet theatre. The New York Times reported in August, in addition to a report that ostrich feathers were making a comeback, that she had returned on the Oceanic after an absence of nine years to appear in New York, billed as Minnie Tittell-Brune at the Manhattan Opera House in An Aztec Romance. By 1913 she was back in London where, during her stay, she made three movies under the name Fanny Tittell-Brune: Esther Redeemed (1915), Iron Justice (1916), and Temptation's Hour (1916). In 1916, Minnie was also credited as being in six other films directed by Hal Roach, starring Harold Lloyd. In 1917 she was singing at London's Coliseum, before she returned to her home country.

Nothing further is known of her career. She became widowed when her husband Clarence died in 1935, and was living in obscurity as a member of the Order of St Francis when she died in her 100th year in Los Angeles in September 1974. She was interred with a Catholic service.

Little noticed in her own country, and lacking even a press obituary, she was nevertheless a major figure in the history of the Australian stage where, for a period, she had been a household name in both Australia and in New Zealand.
