= Mary Marlowe =

Australian actress, writer and journalist (1884–1962)

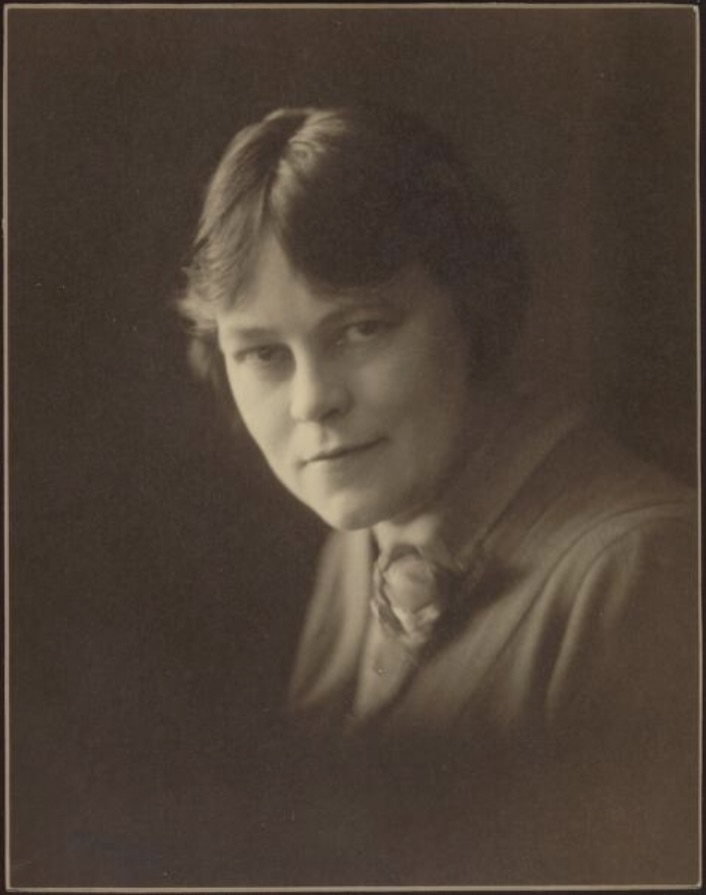
- Marlowe in 1927
- Born: Margaret Mary Shanahan; 18 February 1884; St Kilda, Victoria, Australia
- Died: 19 February 1962 (aged 78); Rooty Hill, New South Wales, Australia
- Notable works: The Women Who Wait

Margaret Mary Marlowe (18 February 1884 – 19 February 1962) was an Australian actress, writer and journalist.

== Early life and education ==
Marlowe was born at the Beaconsfield Hotel, St Kilda, Victoria on 18 February 1884. She was the only child of grazier John and Margaret Shanahan, daughter of John O'Shanassy, second premier of Victoria. She was educated at home by a governess who encouraged her love of reading and writing and also attended a convent in Windsor and studied singing and dancing.

== Career ==
Marlowe first known stage appearance was in March 1906 in The Sign of the Cross. She toured with the Julius Knight Company from 1907. She went to London in 1910 where she performed with Stanley Cook's company, playing Sally Grace in The Man From Mexico. In 1912 she played Kate Rudd in the first performances of On Our Selection.

In 1920 Marlowe returned to Australia where she was employed by the Sydney Sun, writing theatre reviews under the pseudonym "Puck".

Gilbert Mant considered her 1923 novel, Gypsy Royal, Adventuress, "the most clever and realistic novel of modern Australian life that has yet been produced in this country." He continued that she "has a natural gift for characterisation and a very fine descriptive power".

== Death and legacy ==
Marlowe died on 19 February 1962 at Rooty Hill, New South Wales. She was buried at Mona Vale cemetery.

Her autobiography, That Fragile Hour, was published posthumously by Angus and Robertson in 1990. Her papers are held in the State Library of New South Wales.

== Selected works ==
- Kangaroos in King's Land: The Adventures of Four Australian Girls in England, 1917
- The Women Who Wait, 1918
- The Ghost Girl, 1921
- Gypsy Royal, Adventuress, 1923
- A Child by Proxy, 1925 (serialised in the Australian Woman's Mirror)
- An Unofficial Rose, 1927
- Said the Spider: A Romance of Papua and New York, 1929
- Island Calm, 1933 (serialised in the Australian Woman's Mirror)
- Psalmist of the Dawn, 1934
