= Cooee, or Wild Days in the Australian Bush =

1906 play by Edward William O'Sullivan

Coo-ee; Or, Wild Days in the Bush
- Written by: Edward William O'Sullivan
- Original language: English
- Genre: Melodrama
- Setting: Monaro and Braidwood district in Australian outback in the 1860s

Premiere
- Date premiered: 14 April 1906
- Place premiered: Haymarket Hippodrome, Sydney

Coo-ee; Or, Wild Days in the Bush is a 1906 Australian play by Edward William O'Sullivan. It was originally performed by Edward Irham Cole's Bohemian Dramatic Company.

The play was specifically devised as a piece of broad appeal popular theatre.

The play helped develop the concept of the "bush heroine" in Australian culture.

O'Sullivan later accused the writers of the popular 1907 melodrama The Squatter's Daughter of copying his play.

== Premise ==
Jack Bailey is in love with Eva Braddon. The villain, Rupert Seymour, is in cahoots with Ben Hall, the Clarkes, and other notorious bushrangers. Seymour forces Eva's father to consent to marriage with his daughter until stopped by Bailey with the assistance of a faithful black, Nardoo.

== Reception ==
The Sydney Morning Herald declared "As a melodrama "Cooee" is far ahead of many more ambitiously-staged productions, but it is reminiscent of some of them."

The Sydney Sportsman said the play "possesses many of the good points of kindred productions, and few of their bad ones, and was voted a complete success by the intensely interested audience."

The Daily Telegraph said the play "has been carefully thought out and worked upon such lines as will point a moral, through somewhat murky atmosphere albeit, but a moral just the same."

Another review said "his play chiefly fails through its dramatic pudding being so full of sensational plums that each is passed over too quickly to be appreciated by the palate. If two or three speeches were abbreviated, some of the incidents eliminated, and the remainder more fully developed and properly led up to, this would be a very effective play. But the Hippodrome's audiences fairly revel in it, and the curtain goes down nightly on a chorus of Coo-ees, issuing from 1000 throats."
