= Dorothy Dunckley =

Australian make-up artist and actress

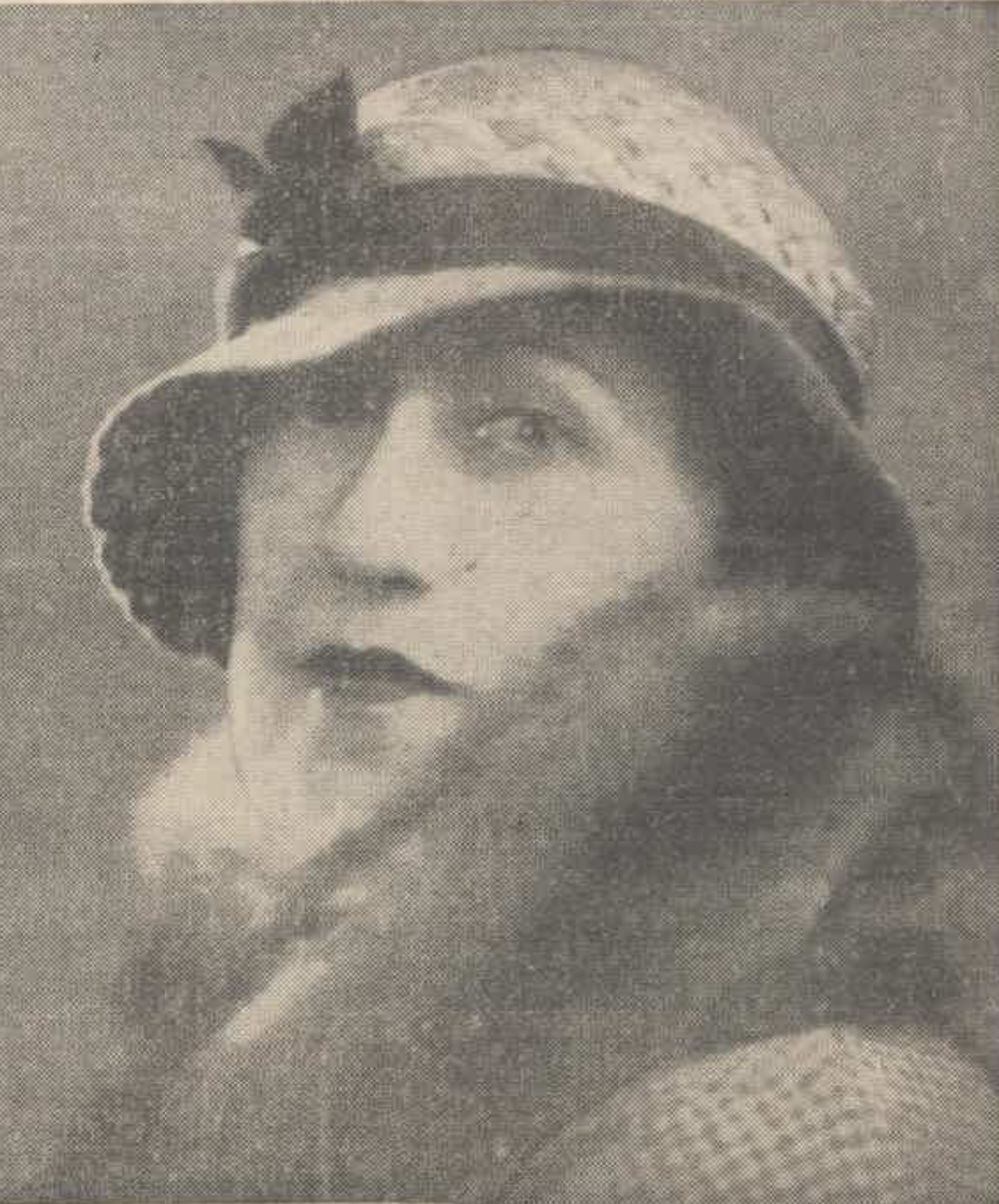
- Dunckley in 1933
- Born: Dorothy Harriette Fraser; 27 February 1890; Bacchus Marsh, Victoria, Australia
- Died: 7 March 1972 (aged 82); Darlinghurst, New South Wales, Australia
- Education: Royal Academy of Dramatic Art

Dorothy Harriette Dunckley (27 February 1890 – 7 March 1972) was an Australian make-up artist, actress and writer.

== Life ==
Born Dorothy Harriette Fraser in Bacchus Marsh, Victoria on 27 February 1890, Dunckley was the daughter of Mary Charlotte (née Cook) and John Fraser. In childhood she relocated to Perth, Western Australia with her family.

She went to London and attended the Royal Academy of Dramatic Art in 1909–1910. She had hoped to become an actress but a recurrent throat problem and operations failed to restore her voice adequately. During WWI she produced and directed amateur theatre performances to raise money for "the boys at the front".

In 1924 she was working as secretary for the Perth Repertory Club but, following a severe illness, moved to Melbourne in 1925. The following year she began writing sketches for broadcast on 3LO. In 1927 she was a member of the Betty Ross Clarke Company and toured to Perth, performing in The House of Glass, The Bride and The Ghost Train. She appeared in Why Smith Left Home at the Grand Opera House in Sydney where The Sydney Morning Herald critic reported she "attracted attention by her amusing impersonation of the simpering Miss Smith".

Dunckley appeared in two films directed by Ken G. Hall. Firstly, as Mrs White in On Our Selection (1932) and then as Miss Ramsbottom in The Squatter's Daughter (1933). In the latter, she was also the make-up artist for the film. Its producers, Cinesound, sent her to Hollywood where she studied make-up techniques for film work and also collected a selection of "detachable nails, teeth and eyelashes". She returned to New York in 1955 to study television make-up.

She did Roy Rene's make-up for the 1934 film, Strike Me Lucky. During American Helen Twelvetrees' visit to Sydney for the filming of Thoroughbred, Dunckley was her private secretary, managing her diary and fan mail.

After losing an expensive artificial eyelash that she had imported, she experimented with different types of hair and invented a piece of equipment to hold the threads while she painstakingly wove, trimmed and curled them. She created three types of eyelashes, for the stage, screen and social use. She adorned one of her evening dresses with milk bottle tops and made earrings from buttons, in each case using chewing gum to hold them together.

She created her own range of stage make-up products. She designed body make-up for Anthony Quayle for his performances of Othello on the Stratford Company's Australian tour in 1952. She believed that it was important for make-up artists to have been actors, so they could imagine the character of the role that an actor would play.

== Personal and death ==
Dunckley married Major Charles Gilmour Dunckley on 19 October 1919 and left Perth for a farm near Bruce Rock. A returned soldier, he had served with the 10th Light Horse at Gallipoli and in Palestine and Syria and was mentioned in despatches in 1917. They had a stillborn child. Her husband predeceased her 1924.

Dunckley died at the Sacred Heart Hospice in Darlinghurst. She donated her body to the University of Sydney.

== Filmography ==
- On Our Selection (1932)
- The Squatter's Daughter (1933)
- Two Minutes Silence (1933)
- Fly by Night (1962)
