= The Christian (1923 film) =

1923 film by Maurice Tourneur

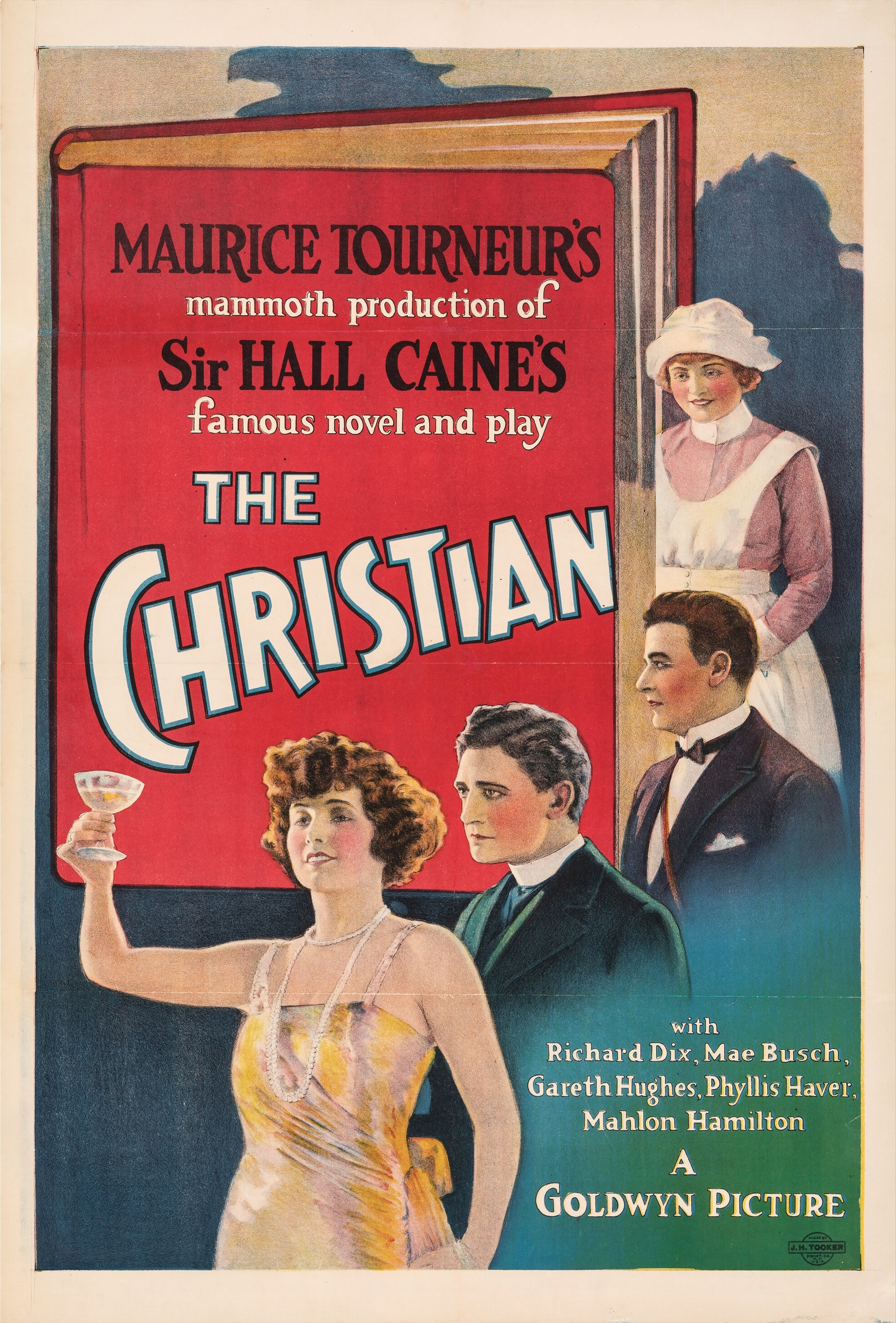
- 1923 theatrical poster
- Directed by: Maurice Tourneur
- Written by: Charles Kenyon
- Based on: The Christian by Hall Caine
- Produced by: Samuel Goldwyn
- Starring: Richard Dix; Mae Busch
- Cinematography: Charles Van Enger
- Edited by: Paul Bern
- Production company: Goldwyn Pictures
- Distributed by: Goldwyn Pictures
- Release date: January 28, 1923
- Running time: 80+ minutes at 8 reels 8,333 feet
- Country: United States
- Languages: Silent film (English intertitles)

The Christian is a 1923 American silent drama film, released by Goldwyn Pictures, directed by Maurice Tourneur, his first production for Goldwyn, and starring Richard Dix and Mae Busch. The film is based on the novel The Christian by Hall Caine, published in 1897, the first British novel to reach the record of one million copies sold. The novel was adapted for the stage, opening on Broadway at the Knickerbocker Theatre October 10, 1898. This was the fourth film of the story; the first, The Christian (1911) was made in Australia.

== Plot ==
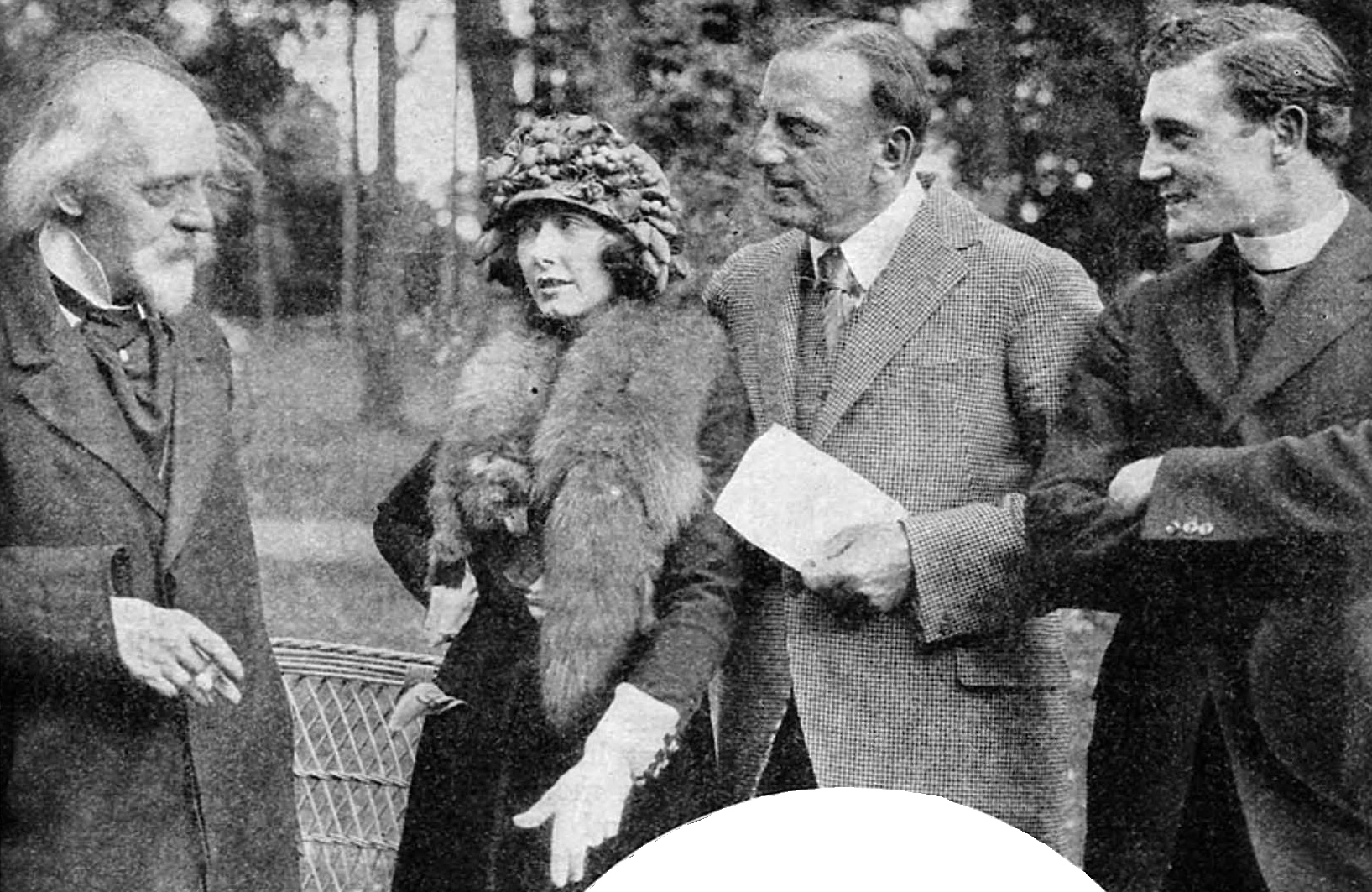
Hall Caine (left) visiting the film's set in 1922 and talking with Mae Busch, director Maurice Tourneur (holding paper), and Richard Dix

John Storm becomes a Christian Socialist, intending to live as Christ would live. He struggles to free himself from his love for Glory Quayle. John and Glory had been childhood sweethearts while growing up in the Isle of Man. As adults they travel to London where Glory becomes a nurse and finally a star on the stage. John enters the church. Later scenes show John's struggles, the meeting of the couple at the race track, his determination to kill Glory to save her from herself and his death in Glory's arms after a stoning by an infuriated mob.

== Cast ==
- Richard Dix as John Storm
- Mae Busch as Glory Quayle
- Gareth Hughes as Brother Paul
- Phyllis Haver as Polly Love
- Cyril Chadwick as Lord Robert Ure
- Mahlon Hamilton as Horatio Drake
- Joseph J. Dowling as Father Lampleigh
- Claude Gillingwater as Lord Storm
- John Herdman as Parson Quayle
- Beryl Mercer as Liza
- Robert Bolder as Reverend Golightly
- Milla Davenport as Matron
- Alice Hesse as Mary
- Aileen Pringle as Lady Robert Ure
- Harry Northrup as Faro King
- Eric Mayne as Doctor
- William F. Moran as Coroner

== Production background ==
The film is based on the novel and play by Hall Caine. On the Broadway stage Viola Allen, played Glory Quayle in 1899. This was the fourth, and last, silent era filming of the story, with previous versions made in 1911 The Christian (Australian), 1914 and 1915. Some filming for this production was done in the United Kingdom.

After the screen version of The Christian was written by Charles Kenyon it was approved by Hall Caine. J. G. Hawks prepared the continuity for the production.

Maurice Tourneur, with the Goldwyn players, headed by Richard Dix and Mae Busch travelled to the Isle of Man for exterior filming where they were joined by Hall Caine who co-operated in the filming of his work and held daily conferences with Tourneur.

== Preservation status ==
The Christian is extant with copies at the George Eastman House, Museum of Modern Art and British Film Institute National Archive.
