= Eugenie Duggan =

Australian actress

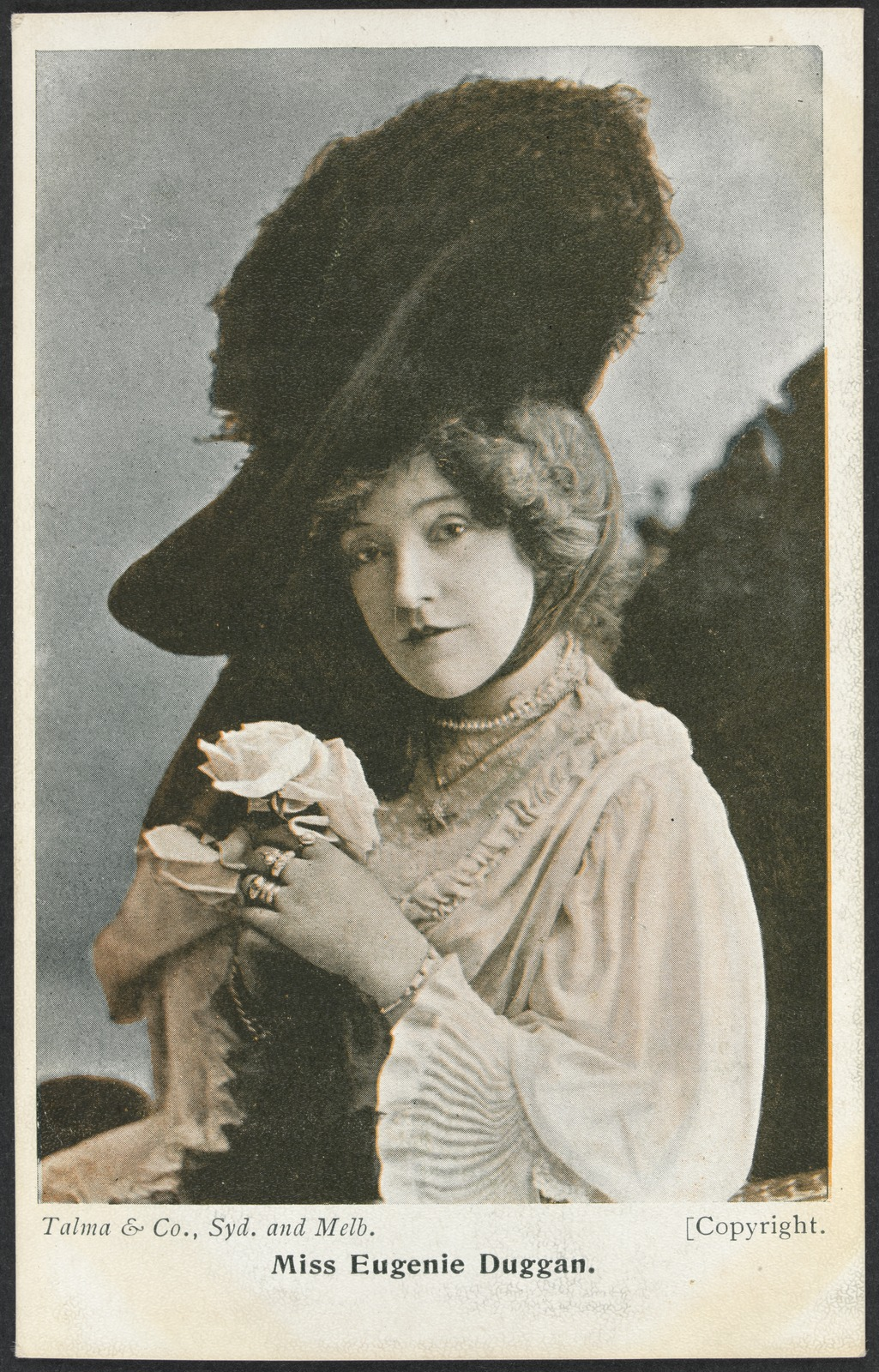
- Miss Eugenie Duggan postcard c. 1900-1910 Collection State Library Victoria (Australia)
- Born: Eugenie Marian Duggan; 1872; Ireland
- Died: 2 November 1936 (aged 63–64); Melbourne, Victoria, Australia
- Resting place: Melbourne General Cemetery
- Spouse: William Anderson
- Children: 1
- Parent(s): Dennis Duggan; Mary Ann Walsh
- Relatives: Edmund Duggan (brother); Patrick P.J. Duggan (brother); Kathleen Duggan (sister)

Eugenie Marian Duggan (1872 – 2 November 1936) was a popular Australian stage actress. In 1907 she was known as "our Queen of Melodrama".

Duggan first worked as a schoolteacher in Melbourne. She was the sister of the actors Edmund, P.J. and Kathleen Duggan. She began studying acting, won a number of elocution competitions and made her professional debut in 1890 in Romeo and Juliet.

She joined the company of theatre entrepreneur William Anderson, and later married him. She played a wide range of roles throughout Australia and New Zealand, including the title part in the original 1907 production of The Squatter's Daughter. In 1910 she played Princess Monica in The Prince and the Beggar Maid in a tour of Australia. In 1911 she appeared in the short film of The Christian as Glory Quayle. In 1920 she toured with her own company, the Eugenie Duggan Company. She later retired from acting and established a drama school. She and Anderson had one child, a daughter, Mary, but were separated at the time of her death on 2 November 1936.

== Select theatrical credits ==
- Cyrano de Bergerac
- East Lynne
- Oliver Twist
- The Silver King (1898)
- A Woman of Pleasure
- The Work Girl
- A Sailor's Sweetheart
- Honor Thy Father
- Mariners of England
- Night Birds of London
- Between Two Women (1904)
- Camille (1905)
- A Girl's Cross Roads
- Human Nature
- The Female Swindler (1905)
- The Ladder of Life
- The Squatter's Daughter (1907)
- Man to Man (1908)
- Hamlet, Prince of Denmark (1909)
- The Winning Ticket (1910)
- The Chance of a Lifetime (1910)
- The Christian (1911)
- My Mate (1911)
- When London Sleeps (1912)
- The Girl of the Never Never (1912)
- The Confession (1913)
- The Little Girl God Forgot (1920)
