= Olive Wilton =

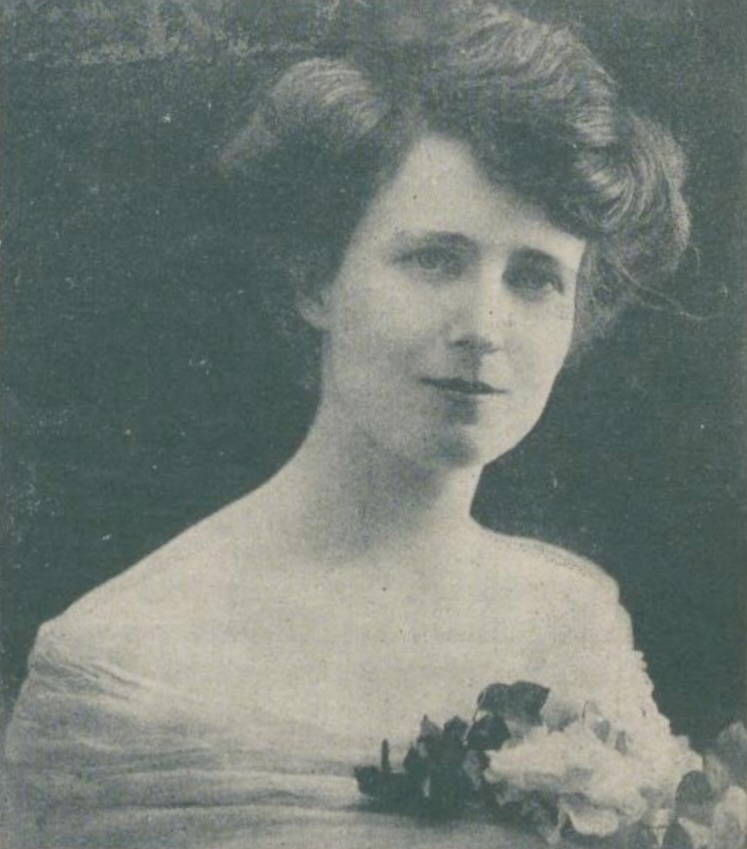
Olive Wilton in 1906

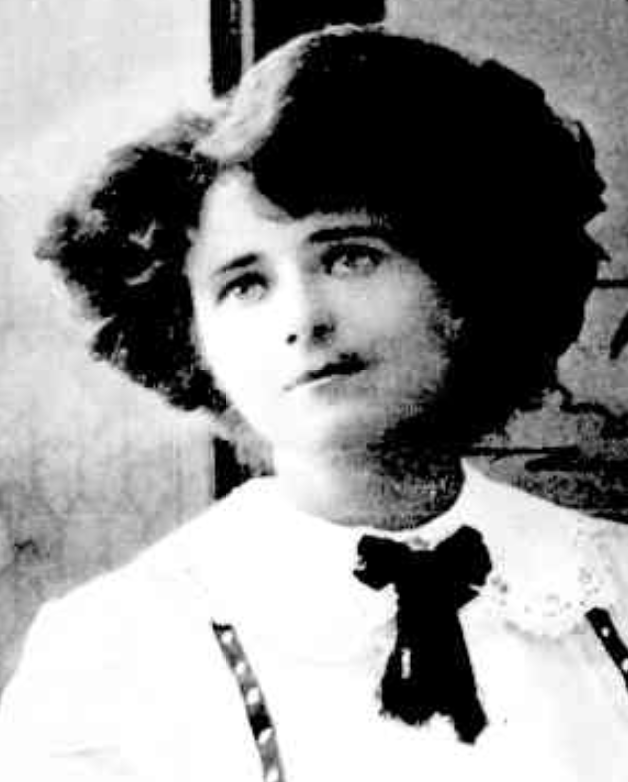
Olive Wilton, c.1912

Olive Dorothea Graeme Wilton OBE (1883–1971) was an English-born stage actor, theatre producer and speech and drama teacher who worked extensively in England and Australia. She came to Australia in 1906 and decided to settle there. In 1910 she played Camiola in The Prince and the Beggar Maid in a tour of Australia. She played the title role in the 1910 Australian silent film The Squatter's Daughter. The last years of her life were spent in Tasmania, where she became a noted figure in education, radio and the arts.

== Select credits ==
=== Acting ===
- The Man from Mexico (1906) – play, Theatre Royal, Adelaide
- The Vagabond and The Talk of the Town (1906) – play, Theatre Royal, Adelaide
- The Bushwoman (1909) – play, Kings Theatre, Melbourne
- The Squatter's Daughter (1910) – film
- By Wireless Telegraphy (1910) – play, Kings Theatre, Melbourne
- The Winning Ticket (1910) – play, Kings Theatre, Melbourne
- My Mate, or a Bush Love Story (1911) – play, Kings Theatre, Melbourne
- The Girl of the Never Never (1912) – play, Kings Theatre, Melbourne
- Damaged Goods (1916) – play, Theatre Royal, Melbourne
- Daddy Long Legs (1917) – play, Criterion Theatre, Sydney
- The Doctor's Dilemma (1919) – play, Kings Theatre, Melbourne
- Kindling (1920) – play, Kings Theatre, Melbourne

=== Directing and/or producing ===
- A Bill of Divorcement (1927) – play, Prince of Wales Theatre, Hobart
- Daybreak (1938) – play, Theatre Royal, Hobart
