= William Anderson (theatre) =

Australian theatre manager (1868-1940)

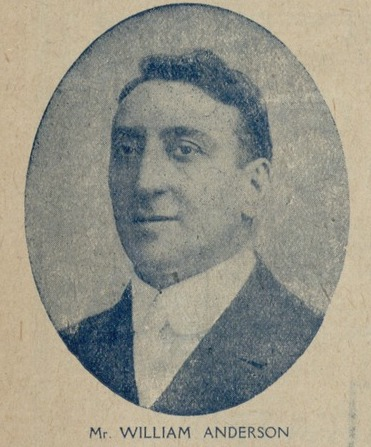
- Anderson c. 1914
- Born: 14 January 1868; Sandhurst (Bendigo), Victoria, Australia
- Died: 16 August, 1940 (aged 71–72); St Kilda, Melbourne, Victoria, Australia
- Resting place: Melbourne General Cemetery
- Occupation: theatre entrepreneur
- Spouse: Eugenie Duggan (m. 1898)
- Children: Mary Anderson

William Anderson (14 January 1868 – 16 August 1940) was an Australian theatre entrepreneur.

He left school at age ten and eventually found work as a theatre manager, marrying the actress Eugenie Duggan. He established two theatre companies and had a profitable association with Charles Holloway, opened Wonderland City in Sydney and built the Kings Theatre in Melbourne. He produced several classics of the Australian stage including Thunderbolt (1905), The Squatter's Daughter (1907) (which he filmed in 1910) and The Man from Outback (1909), as well as co-writing several plays.

Hic comedy company was playing at the Tivoli Theatre, Adelaide in February 1917 when Hugh D. McIntosh's Tivoli Follies company was booked to play at the same venue, resulting in a clash and both managements accusing the other of misrepresentation.

Anderson worked with such actors and writers as Edmund Duggan, Bert Bailey, Olive Wilton and Roy Redgrave and for a time his private secretary was Beaumont Smith. The financial failure of Wonderland City cost him his personal fortune, but he remained involved in theatre productions until the end of his life.

== Selected credits ==
- Thunderbolt (1905) - producer
- The Squatter's Daughter (1907) – producer
- The Bushwoman (1909) - producer
- White Australia (1909) - producer
- The Man from Outback (1909) – producer
- The Squatter's Daughter (1910) – film, producer
- The Winning Ticket (play) (1910) – producer, co-writer
- By Wireless Telegraphy (1910) – producer, co-writer
- For Homestead and Honour (1912) - producer
- The Sunny Corner (1915) - producer
