= On Our Selection (1912 play) =

1912 play by Bert Bailey and Edmund Duggan

- Original language: English
- Written by: Bert Bailey; Edmund Duggan
- Characters: Dad Rudd; Dave Rudd
- Setting: Rural Queensland

Premiere
- Date: 1912

On Our Selection is a 1912 Australian play by Bert Bailey and Edmund Duggan based on the stories with the same name by Steele Rudd. Bailey played Dad Rudd in the original production.

It was one of the most popular Australian plays of all time.

== Plot ==
The play consists of four acts. It starts with the selection of Dad Rudd in the grip of drought. His neighbour John Carey seizes his stock for a debt, partly to get revenge for Dad having secured an adjoining piece of land coveted by Carey. Carey's playboy son Jim is romantically interested in Dad's daughter Kate and follows her to Brisbane.

Kate returns home to escape Jim Carey, who follows her home. There is an encounter between Jim Carey, Kate and Kate's boyfriend Sandy which results in Sandy knocking Carey unconscious. Jim Carey is discovered by local eccentric, 'Cranky Jack', who recognises Carey as the man who ran off with Jack's wife and strangles him to death. The body is discovered by Sandy and Kate who believe that Sandy has accidentally been responsible for killing Carey. Sandy escapes detection and the inquest returns a verdict that Jim Carey was murdered by some person or persons unknown.

Dad Rudd becomes a prosperous farmer and his friends encourage him to run for parliament against John Carey. Carey overhears an incriminating conversation between Sandy and Kate and arranges a warrant for Sandy's arrest. However Crank Jack then attacks John Carey, thinking he is his son, confessing to the crime. He is dragged away and Sandy's name is cleared. Dad Rudd is elected to parliament.

== History ==
Steele Rudd originally worked on an adaptation of his stories in collaboration with Beaumont Smith. The result was unsatisfactory, so Bailey and Duggan wrote their version. However Beaumont Smith was credited as co-author in some articles on the original production.

The main change the adaptors made to the stories was to add more of a plot, building up the character of Carey into a villain, making "Cranky Jack" a murderer and throwing suspicion on Sandy.

Steele Rudd received very little money from the success of the play as copyright protection for authors was exceedingly poor before 1912. According to academics Roslyn Atkinson and Richard Fothering ham Rudd was "the last as well as the most important Australian playwright to be forced to operate under the old legislation, and to be seriously disadvantaged by it. The imperfect laws covering intellectual property go a long way towards explaining why Rudd has been glibly dismissed as a poor businessman, and why early Australian dramatists in general found their trade to be financially a singularly unrewarding one."

== Original cast ==
- Bert Bailey as Dad (Joseph Murtagh) Rudd
- Guy Hastings as Sandy
- Fred MacDonald as Dave Rudd
- Alfreda Bevan as Mum
- Willie Driscoll as Uncle Rudd
- Edmund Duggan as Moloney
- Alfred Harford as the Reverend Mr Macpherson
- George Kensington as John Carey
- Mary Marlowe as Kate Rudd
- Laura Roberts as Sara Rudd
- George Treloar as Jim Carey
- Queenie Sefton as Mrs White
- Jack Lennon as Cranky Jack
- Lilias Adeson
- Arthur Bertram

== Reception ==
The play made its debut in Sydney at the Theatre Royal on 4 May 1912 and was an enormous success. It toured throughout the country and was frequently revived until the 1930s. There was a sequel Grandad Rudd.

=== Film adaptations ===
The 1932 version of On Our Selection, which starred Bailey and MacDonald, and its three sequels, owed more to the play than Steele Rudd's original stories. The 1920 version from director Raymond Longford was closer to the stories.

=== Later revivals ===
The play was revived again in 1979 by director George Whaley at the Jane Street Theatre with Don Crosby as Dad, Geoffrey Rush as Dave and Mel Gibson as Sandy, plus Noni Hazlehurst, Jon Blake, John Clayton and Kerry Walker. This production was later transferred to the Nimrod Theatre and was adapted into a film by Whaley in 1995.

== Legacy ==
The success of the play saw many other similar Australian plays be presented including:

- The Waybacks (1915)
- McClure and the Parson (1916)
- Grandad Rudd (1917)
- Possum Paddock (1919)
- Kangaroo Flat
- Gum Tree Gully
