= Roy Redgrave =

English actor (1873–1922)

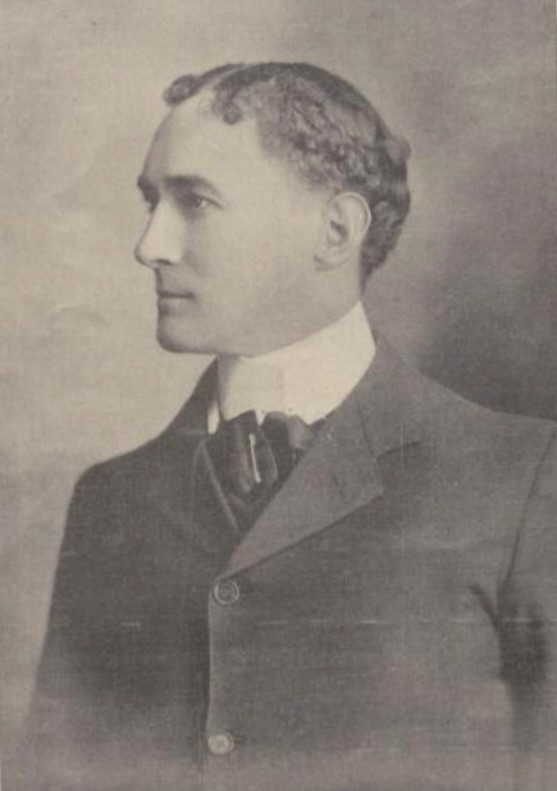
- Redgrave in 1905
- Born: George Edward Redgrave; 26 April 1873; Kennington, London, England
- Died: 25 May 1922 (aged 49); Sydney, Australia
- Occupation: Actor
- Years active: 1900–20
- Spouses: Ellen Maud Pratt (m. 1894; div. 1905) Margaret Scudamore (m. 1907; sep. 1908) Mary Seward Leresche (m. 1916)
- Children: 5, including Michael
- Relatives: See Redgrave family
- Website: http://www.redgrave.com/biorr.htm

George Elsworthy "Roy" Redgrave (26 April 1873 – 25 May 1922) was an English stage and silent film actor. Redgrave is considered to be the first member of the Redgrave acting dynasty.

== Early life ==
Born George Edward Redgrave in 122 Kennington Road, Kennington, a district of Lambeth in south London in 1873, he was the eldest son of George Augustus Redgrave (1851–81), a maker of the board game Bagatelle, and Zoe Beatrice Elsworthy (née Pym, later Howard; 1856–1936). By 1897, he was professionally known as Roy Redgrave apparently in the belief that he was descended from Rob Roy. The Redgrave family originated in the Northamptonshire village of Crick. Redgrave also assumed the middle name "Elsworthy" from his mother, and his sister took the stage name Dolly Elsworthy. Redgrave was the eldest of five siblings.

== Family and career ==
His first wife was actress Ellen Maud Pratt, the daughter of prosperous Devon farmer John Dew Pratt of Buckland Monachorum. Her stage name was Judith Kyrle. They were married in Littleham-cum-Exmouth, Devon on 1 September 1894. Their careers reached a high point at their joint debut at the Britannia Theatre, Hoxton in April 1900 with Roy billed as "The Dramatic Cock o' the North". They had three children, John Kyrle born in 1895, Robin Roy (father of Major-General Sir Roy Redgrave) born in 1897 and Nellie Maud born in 1898.

About this time Redgrave fell in love with a young actress named Esther Mary Cooke (known on the stage as Ettie Carlisle), daughter of Victor Cooke, huntsman and riding master. Ellen discovered the affair and Ettie fled Britain for South Africa. Redgrave followed her to South Africa. Ettie married Clayton Parrett by special licence between 28 October and 10 November 1903, on a Sunday at St. George's Cathedral in Cape Town. Redgrave arrived two days later on the Tuesday. Ettie then left Clayton Parrett and went with Redgrave to Australia where she then bore him a son, Victor Redgrave Parrett, born 25 July 1906 in Australia.

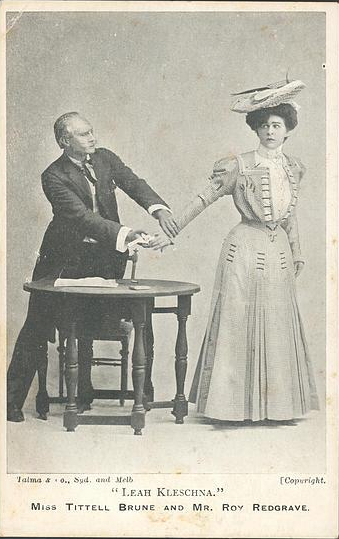
Roy Redgrave and Miss Minnie Tittell Brune appearing in Leah Kleschna, c. 1907

At some point after initial Australian theatre work, Redgrave left for England alone. According to the "History of Australian Theatre" archives, American actress Minnie Tittell Brune made her first appearance in Australia on 21 September 1904 at Her Majesty's Theatre, Sydney in the play Sunday, supported by Roy Redgrave. Roy toured with her on the J. C. Williamson circuit. According to Corin Redgrave, Ellen (Judith) pursued Roy to Australia, arriving in time to pay his unsettled hotel bills, but she was unable to persuade him to return home with her to his family. Ellen remarried Frederick John Nettlefold, a respectable landed gentleman, in Brighton, England in 1907.

However, Roy Redgrave did return to Britain, appearing in repertory at the Grand Theatre, Brighton, where he met Daisy Bertha Mary Scudamore. She eventually adopted the stage name Margaret Scudamore. They married at Glasgow Register Office in 1907 while touring in the north and had one child, the actor Sir Michael Redgrave born on 20 March 1908, later to become the father of actors Vanessa, Corin and Lynn. Six months after Michael's birth, Redgrave abandoned his wife and returned to Australia again, this time permanently. William Anderson, a Melbourne producer, had just built the King's Theatre, and needed actors. His name appears in June 1909, when he performed in the play The Bank of England. In 1910, he played Prince Michael in The Prince and the Beggar Maid in a tour of Australia. In the same year, Anderson, known for his fondness of the lurid and sensational, had Roy collaborate with him on a play about the just ended Dr. Crippen case. Crippen was hanged in November 1910. The play was called By Wireless Telegraphy, which was staged by Anderson at the King's Theatre, Melbourne, from 22 October 1910.

Anderson was ruined financially by an expensive flop, and had to lease away his King's Theatre, and Redgrave turned his attention to the new and burgeoning film industry, under contract to Lincoln-Cass Films. Although he claimed he did not like motion picture acting he appeared in several silent films, beginning in 1911 with The Christian. Later he played the villain in Moondyne (1913) as well as six shorts, played the lead in Our Friends, the Hayseeds (1917), and co-starred in Robbery Under Arms (1920). Back in the UK, the forsaken Daisy had changed her name to Margaret and married Captain James Anderson, a wealthy tea planter.

== Remaining in Australia ==
Redgrave remained in Australia until his death sometime in the 1920s, but exactly where he lived and when he died remained a mystery to his family in Britain until his granddaughter Lynn Redgrave visited Sydney with her then husband John Clark and vowed to find him. Their search ended at the Sydney Opera House library, where, as she recounts in her play Shakespeare for My Father (page 48), they came up with Redgrave's obituary, learning that he had died on 25 May 1922, and was buried at South Head Cemetery. There they learned that he had been put in an unmarked grave by somebody called Minnie, who paid 15 shillings. They found the spot, and arranged for a headstone, asked his son Michael what it should say, and he said to put, simply, "Roy Redgrave, Actor". It was later discovered that Redgrave married a widow, Mary Leresche, in 1916. His marriage certificate makes reference to his previous marriage to Ellen (Judith) but not to any subsequent marriage to Daisy (Margaret Scudamore). Mary Leresche Redgrave died in 1948.

== Silent filmography ==
- The Christian (1911) .... John Storm
- Transported (1913)
- The Sick Stockrider (1913)
- The Road to Ruin (1913)
- The Reprieve (1913)
- The Remittance Man (1913)
- Moondyne (1913) .... Isaac Bowman
- The Crisis (1913)
- Our Friends, the Hayseeds (1917) aka The Hayseeds (Australia) .... Dad Hayseed
- Robbery Under Arms (1920) .... Dan Moran

== See also ==
- List of British actors
