= Bert Bailey =

New Zealand-born Australian playwright, theatrical manager and actor

- Born: Albert Edward Bailey; 11 June 1868; Auckland, New Zealand
- Died: 30 March 1953 (aged 84)
- Other name: Albert Edmunds (with stage partner Edmund Duggan
- Occupations: Writer, actor, theatrical manager
- Years active: 1883-1943
- Spouse: Ivy Gorrick

Albert Edward Bailey (11 June 1868 – 30 March 1953), better known as Bert Bailey, was a New Zealand-born Australian playwright, theatrical manager and stage and screen actor best known for playing Dad Rudd, in both mediums, the character from the books penned by Steele Rudd.

== Early life ==
Bailey was born in Auckland, New Zealand, the second son of farmer Christopher Bailey and Harriette Adelaide. His parents divorced and Bailey's mother moved with him to Sydney when he was six months old. She remarried in 1879 and went on to become a noted retailer, establishing the firm McCathie's.

Bailey was educated at Crown Street School and Cleveland Street Public School. He decided not to go into the family business and worked as a telegram boy and at a floor manager at Crystal Palace skating rink. At age fifteen he went into vaudeville as a tambourine player and vocalist at Canterbury Music Hall in George Street, Sydney.

In 1889 he joined the touring theatrical company of Edmund Duggan, playing a wide variety of roles throughout Australia. In 1900 he and Duggan joined the company of noted theatre producer William Anderson, who was Duggan's brother-in-law.

== Playwriting career ==
In 1907 Bailey and Duggan wrote a play together under the joint pseudonym of "Albert Edmunds", The Squatter's Daughter (1907). This was produced by Anderson to great success and was adapted into a film in 1910, which Bailey directed as well as appeared in.

He and Duggan collaborated on a number of follow up plays (with both men also acting in the productions), including The Man from Outback (1909), The Prince and the Beggar Maid (1910), On Our Selection (1912), an adaptation of the stories of Steele Rudd and The Native Born (1913). Of these the most popular was On Our Selection which became an Australian theatrical phenomenon, with over hundreds of productions through to the present day. Bailey would perform the role of Dad Rudd on and off for the rest of his career.

== Theatre entrepreneur ==
In 1912 Bailey ended his 12-year association with Anderson and went into partnership with his business manager, Julius Grant. The two of them leased the Anderson Theatre in Melbourne and formed a highly successful association as theatre producers. Bailey also frequently toured with the 'Bert Bailey Dramatic Company'. He and Grant did suffer some commercial failures, such as a season of plays by William Shakespeare and a 1920 production of On Our Selection in London.

After touring in the Barry Conners play The Patsy for 23 weeks in 1929, Bailey retired from performing, believing that talking films were making theatre unprofitable.

== Film career ==
In June 1931, it was reported that a film production company under the dual control of Union Theatres and Bert Bailey were making "talkies" in Sydney in their studios at Bondi Junction. The Bondi Junction Studios had made five short films, and were then in the process of adding a soundtrack to a new version of the previously silent documentary film With Mawson in the South.

Bailey was brought out of retirement in 1932 by Stuart F. Doyle to play Dad Rudd in a film version of On Our Selection, which he also co-wrote. He received £400 plus 60% of the profits which, for that movie, came to an estimated £14,000 by the end of 1934.

Bailey played Dad Rudd in three more films, contributing to the script as well for each film. All four Rudd films were directed by Ken G. Hall who also directed an adaptation of The Squatter's Daughter. After Dad Rudd, MP (1940), Bailey retired for good, apart from a brief appearance in a propaganda short made for the war effort, South West Pacific (1943).

== Personal life ==
Bailey married fellow actor Ivy Gorrick in 1902 and they had one child, a daughter, Doreen. His wife died in 1932 and Bailey never remarried. His habits included lawn bowls, boating and travelling with his daughter.

In 1937 it was estimated that Bailey had earned £200,000 from On Our Selection. He died a wealthy man with an estate worth £32,527.

== Filmography ==
- The Squatter's Daughter (1910) – original play, actor, director
- The Christian (1911) – actor
- On Our Selection (1932) – actor, co-writer, original play
- The Squatter's Daughter (1933) – original play only
- Grandad Rudd (1935) – actor, co-writer
- Dad and Dave Come to Town – actor, co-writer
- Dad Rudd, MP (1940) – actor, co-writer
- South West Pacific (1943) – actor

== Select theatre credits ==
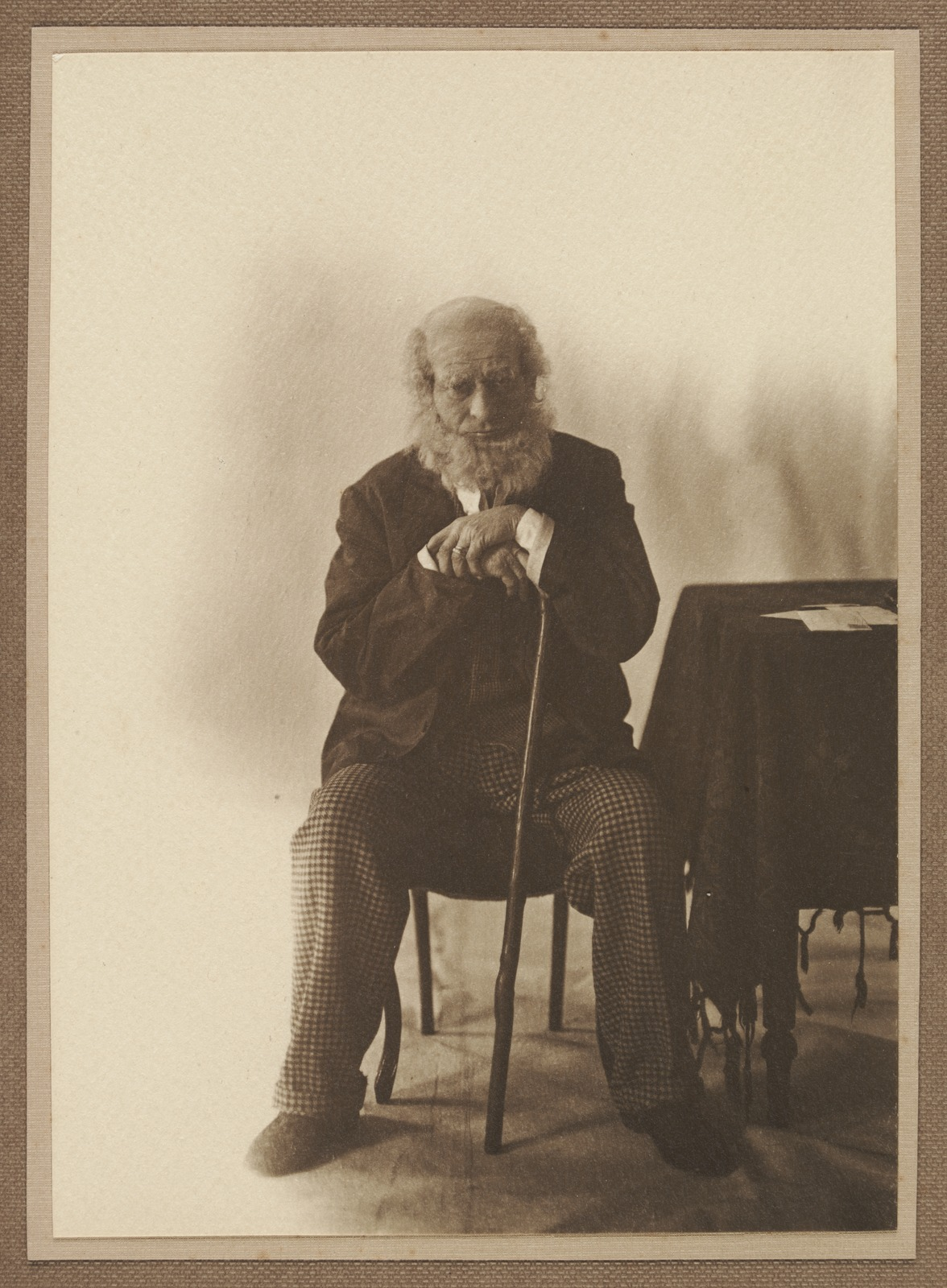
Bert Bailey in costume c. 1910-1913 by Mina Moore H38782/48

- Criterion Comedy Burlesque Opera (1895) – actor in tour around New South Wales
- True Til Death (1896) – actor
- Harbour Lights (1896) – actor
- The Profligate (1896) – actor
- The American Girl or, A Play Without a Plot (1898) - actor
- The World Against Her (1898) – actor
- The Southern Cross (1898) – actor
- East Lynne (1899) – actor
- The Ladder of Life – actor
- The Squatter's Daughter, or, The Land of the Wattle (1907) – actor, co-writer
- White Australia or, The Empty North (1909) – actor
- The Man from Outback (1909) – co-writer, actor
- The Bushwoman (1909)
- The Winning Ticket (1910) – actor
- The Christian (1911)
- My Mate (1911) – actor
- On Our Selection (1912) – actor, co-writer, producer
- The Native Born (1913) – co-writer, actor, producer
- What Happened to Mary (1914) – actor, producer
- The Ninety-and-Nine (1913) – producer
- McClure and the Parson (1916) and (1918) – actor, producer, co-writer
- Gran’dad Rudd (1918) – producer, co-writer
- On Our Selection (1920) – London production – actor
- Jefferson Wins Through the King (1921) – producer
- The Sentimental Bloke (1922–23) – producer, actor (as Ginger Mick)
- The Patsy (1929) – actor
