= The Squatter's Daughter (play) =

1907 Australian play by Bert Bailey and Edmund Duggan

The Squatter's Daughter or, The Land of the Wattle
- Poster from 1908 Production
- Original language: English
- Written by: Bert Bailey; Edmund Duggan
- Characters: Violet Enderby; Archie McPherson
- Genre: Melodrama

Premiere
- Date: 9 February 1907
- Place: Theatre Royal, Melbourne

The Squatter's Daughter or, The Land of the Wattle is a 1907 Australian play by Bert Bailey and Edmund Duggan, writing under the combined pseudonym Albert Edmunds.

== Synopsis ==
The story is set in the 1860s and focuses on the rivalry between two neighbouring sheep stations in rural Australia, "Enderby" and "Waratah". Enderby is owned by a woman, the feisty Violet Enderby, the "squatter's daughter". Waratah is owned by James Harrington, who is Violet's guardian.

Violet is in love with Tom Bathurst, an overseer employed on Waratah. While James Harrington is away, the property is being run by his son, the weak Dudley Harrington, who seeks to undermine Bathurst in the eyes of Violet and his father. Having failed in that he gets bushranger Ben Hall and his gang to abduct Violet and hold her for ransom. Matters are complicated by the presence of an English "new chum", Archie McPherson.

== Original production ==
The play was originally produced by William Anderson and made its debut at the Theatre Royal in Melbourne on 9 February 1907, starring both Bailey and Duggan in supporting roles.

The production featured real sheep, kookaburras, shearers, wood choppers, whip-cracking, sheep dogs, a waterfall and a fight between a man and a kangaroo.

It ran for seven weeks then had an equally popular season in Sydney before touring around Australia and New Zealand for the next three years. The producers later claimed during this time it grossed £70,000 and was seen by an estimated 1.5 million people, making it the most popular Australian melodrama to date.

When Bailey went into theatrical management with Julius Grant, his first production was a revival of the play.

Edward William O'Sullivan accused the writers of The Squatter's Daughter of borrowing the story from his play Cooee, or Wild Days in the Australian Bush.

== Adaptations ==
The play was filmed twice, as a silent film in 1910, directed by Bailey, and a sound feature in 1933. It was also adapted into a novel in 1922 by Hilda Bridges.

== Influence ==
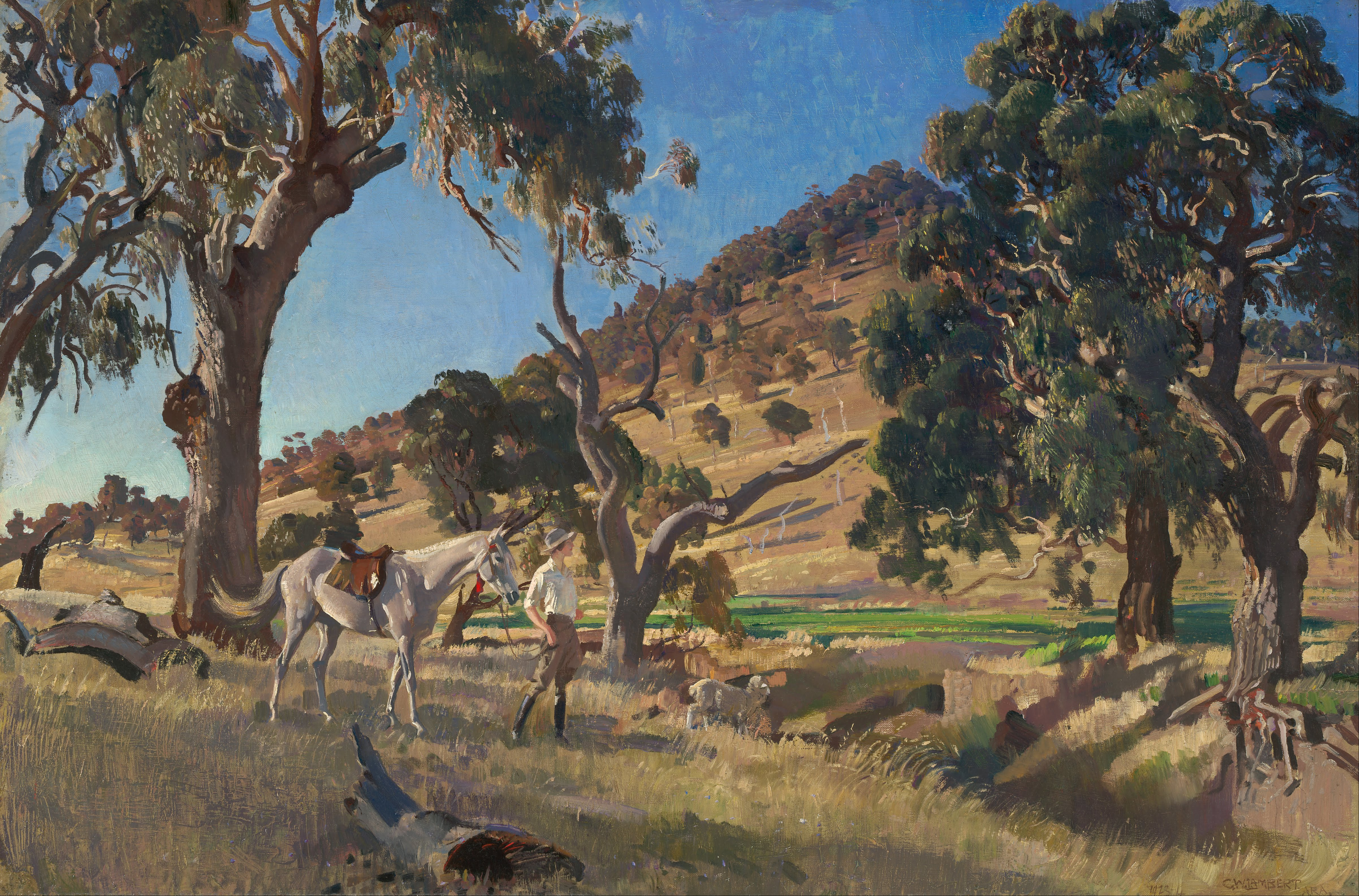
George Washington Lambert, The Squatter's Daughter, 1923, National Gallery of Australia

The play helped popularise the archetype of the "squatter's daughter", the feisty woman of the Australian bush. This character appeared in many subsequent Australian books, plays, films and TV shows, including The Picture Show Man (1977) and McLeod's Daughters (2001-2009).
