= Edmund Duggan (playwright) =

Irish-Australian actor and playwright (1862-1938)

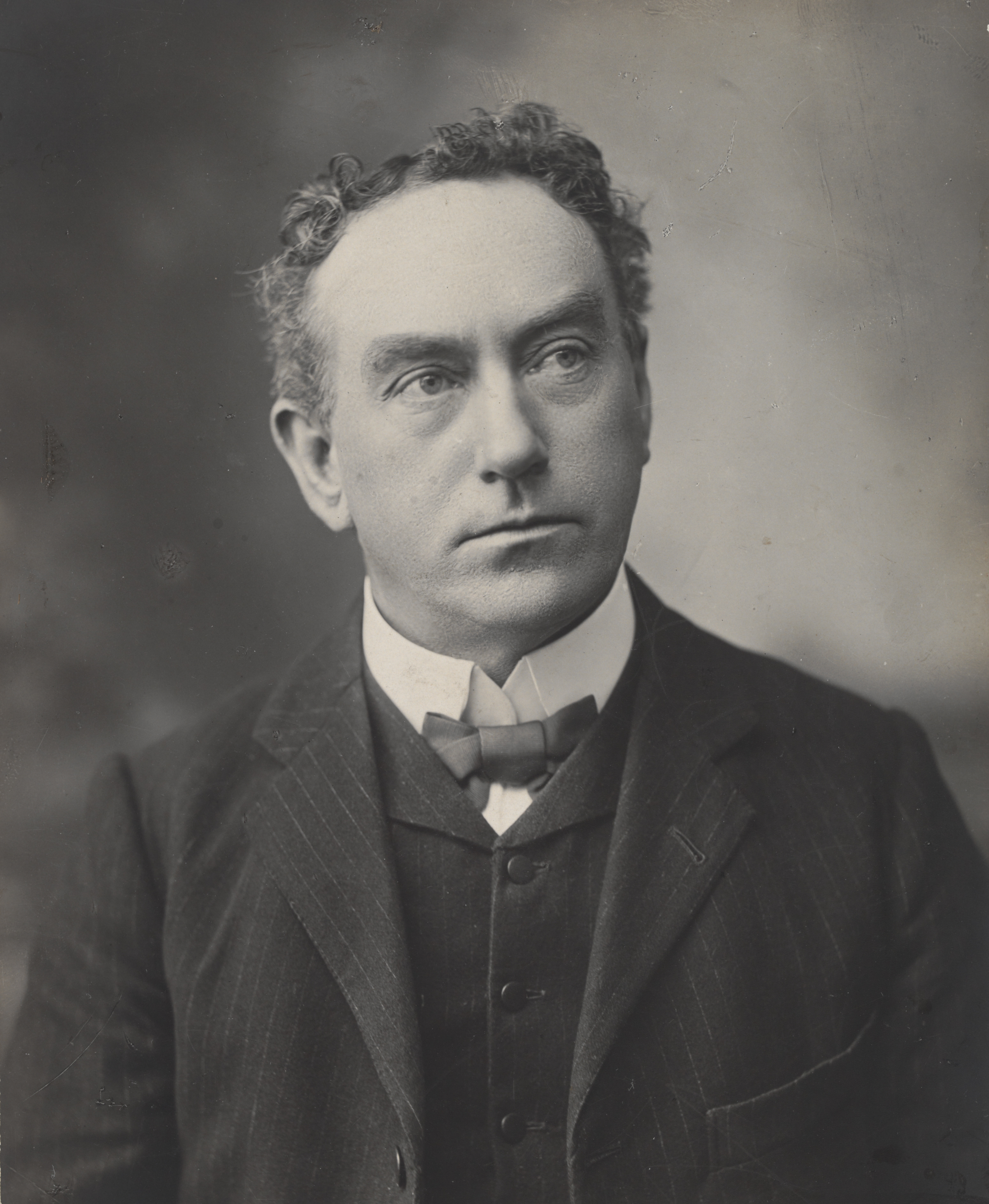
- Duggan c. 1905
- Born: 1862; Lismore, County Waterford, Ireland
- Died: 12 August 1938 (aged 75–76); Melbourne, Victoria, Australia
- Resting place: Boroondara Cemetery
- Occupations: Playwright, actor
- Spouse: Beatrice Ann Hamea (m. 1899)
- Children: Rosalind Duggan; Eugenie Duggan
- Parent(s): Dennis Duggan; Mary Ann Walsh
- Relatives: Eugenie Duggan (sister); Patrick (P.J.) Duggan (brother); Kathleen Duggan (sister)

Edmund Duggan (1862 – 2 August 1938) was an Irish-born actor and playwright who worked in Australia. He is best known for writing a number of plays with Bert Bailey including The Squatter's Daughter (1907) and On Our Selection (1912). His solo career was less successful than Bailey's. His sister Eugenie was known as "The Queen of Melodrama" and married noted theatre producer William Anderson, for whom Duggan frequently worked as an actor, writer and stage manager.

Between 1892 and 1895 Duggan and South's "Her Majesty's Dramatic Company", toured New South Wales with (inter alia) La Tosca, All for Gold, Greta. His Natural Life and Robbery Under Arms. consistently receiving good notices.

Duggan's wife died two years before he did and he was survived by two daughters.

== Select theatre credits ==
- The Democrat (1891) – writer (later revived as Eureka Stockade)
- For the Term of his Natural Life (1897) – writer (adapting the novel), (1909) acted (played Maurice Freere)
- Cyrano de Bergerac (1902) – acted (played Capt. Carbon de Castel Jaloux)
- Lady Audley's Secret (1906)
- The Squatter's Daughter, or, The Land of the Wattle (1907) – wrote with Bert Bailey as 'Albert Edmunds'
- The Southern Cross (1907) – writer
- Man to Man (1908) – actor
- The Bushwoman (1909) – acted (played Ned Brandon) and directed
- The Man from Outback (1909) – wrote with Bert Bailey as 'Albert Edmunds'
- The Chance of a Lifetime (1910) – acted (played trainer Mat Lawson)
- The Christian (1911) – acted (played Father Enderby)
- My Mate, or a Bush Love Story (1911) – writer
- On Our Selection (1912) – wrote with Bert Bailey as 'Albert Edmunds'
- The Native Born (1913) – wrote with Bert Bailey as 'Albert Edmunds'
- Duncan McClure and the Poor Parson (1916) – acted (played Duncan McClure) (1918) – acted (played Jacob Wattleton)
- Gran'dad Rudd (1917) – acted (played Denis Regan)
- On Our Selection (1920) (revival) – produced
- The Rudd Family by Steele Rudd (1928) – produced, acted
