= Our Friends, the Hayseeds =

- Sydney Sun 11 March 1917
- Directed by: Beaumont Smith
- Written by: Beaumont Smith
- Produced by: Beaumont Smith
- Starring: Roy Redgrave
- Cinematography: Harry Krischock
- Production company: Beaumont Smith Film Productions
- Release dates: 2 February 1917 (preview); 19 March 1917 (Sydney theatrical)
- Running time: 5,000 feet or 60 mins
- Country: Australia
- Language: English

Our Friends, the Hayseeds is a 1917 Australian rural comedy from director Beaumont Smith. It centers on the rural family, the Hayseeds, and their rivalry with a neighbouring family, the Duggans.

It was Smith's first movie as a director and was a popular success at the box office, leading to a number of sequels. However no known copy of it exists today and it is considered a lost film.

== Synopsis ==
The Hayseeds and Duggans live on selections next to each other. Joe Hayseed and Pansy Duggan want to get married but their families quarrel when the Hayseeds' cow gets into the Duggan's corn and they are forbidden to see each other.

The two families have a brawl on the bush fence, a fight that only ends in exhaustion. However, a bush fire unites them and Jim and Pansy marry. Pansy falls pregnant and Dad Hayseed and Dad Duggan both hope for a boy which will be named after them. She ends up giving birth to twin girls.

The film was divided into four sections: the first two dealing with a day in the life of the Hayseeds; the last two under the title "Pansy's Wooing" with Joe and Pansy's courtship. A contemporary reviewer said that of the film's 5,000 foot length, 1,000 feet was dedicated to humorous titles.

== Cast ==
Cast of film

- Roy Redgrave as Dad Hayseed
- Walter Cornock as Joe Hayseed
- Pearl Hellmrich as Pansy Duggan
- Margaret Gordon as Mrs. Hayseed
- J. Plumpton Wilson as Parson
- H.H. Wallace as Dan Hayseed
- Vera Spaull as Poppy Hayseed
- Cecil Haines as Lizzy Hayseed
- Jack Radford as Tommy Hayseed
- Peter Ward as Peter Hayseed
- Tom Cannam as hired hand
- Percy Mackay as Mr Duggan
- Nan Taylor as Mrs Duggan
- Crosbie Ward as Mike Duggan
- Fred Carlton as Jack Dugggan
- Olga Agnew as Mollie Duggan
- Gerald Kay Souper as parliamentarian
- Esther Mitchell as his wife

== Production ==
Adelaide Critic 1917

The movie was inspired by the success of Bert Bailey's stage adaptation of Steele Rudd's Dad and Dave stories, On Our Selection and Philip Lytton's play The Waybacks. Smith had worked with Bailey and Edmund Duggan on the initial production of Selection.

Smith was a theatrical manager touring Adelaide with some shows. He was losing money and decided to pivote to filmmaking. According to Everyones "tt was hot —as only it can be in Adelaide —and on a Sabbath that Beau Smith with a little debit balance against him in his theatrical ventures —drove out to Paradise with a team of actors —there to commence the first of the “Hayseeds” series which was finally to lure him from the stage to the screen."

Shooting took place on location in South Australia in Campbelltown and Norwood. Many of the cast had appeared in Beaumont Smith's theatrical productions of While the Billy Boils (which he filmed in 1921) and Seven Little Australians.

While shooting the bushfire scene off the side of a hill at Campbelltown, the fire got out of control and momentarily trapped the actors. According to contemporary press reports, "they came out of that fire black as coal heavers, almost blind with smoke, and singed badly. Their faces were a study of horror and fear, and that heartless photographer turned the handle all the time. But he got a most realistic picture."

Filming finished on Thursday 1 February 1917 and the film was previewed for local cinema owners in Adelaide the following morning.

== Reception ==
Sunday Times 18 March 1917

Sydney Sun 4 March 1917

The film was previewed in Sydney on 28 February 1917.

It was commercially released in Sydney in March, then rolled out throughout the rest of Australia over 1917.

=== Critical ===
The Adelaide Mail said of the film that "the tone was pleasing, and made an undeniably good impression on those who witnessed it... the film is splendidly put together. It contains but little plot, most of the scenes presenting incidents of everyday life. Some of the scenes, however, are a little drawn-out, particularly the fight between the Hayseed and Duggan families."

The Adelaide Register called it "a clever study".

The Adelaide Journal wrote "it gives a remarkably vivid conception of a settler's hardships and vicissitudes. Many of the scenes are familiar, but they have been connected by Mr. Beaumont Smith in a telling manner, and he has woven an interesting story around the incidents of backblocks life."

The Adelaide Advertiser wrote "As Dad Hayseed Mr. Roy Redgrave is beyond criticism. He is the cocky farmer of the comedy stage, even to the gait and his indifference to appearances."

The Bulletin said, "The story is genuinely Australian, with its pictures of the slaves to Cow, the quarrel of neighbors over straying Cow, and the reconciliation when all hands are called in to help at a bushfire on the land of one of the quarrellers."

The Sydney Morning Herald said the film contained "rugged types of character are pressed into service which need no introduction to those who have read or seen On Our Selection, The Waybacks and While the Billy Boils. Nearly all the episodes are in the open, and the photography is remarkably good."

=== Box office ===
In May 1917 Table Talk reported the film had "been doing good business in Sydney fior the past two months".

In July 1917 another writer from The Bulletin stated the film "is having as successful a run in the country as any other all-Australian production, though the exaggeration is silently resented. The general setting is right, but the family fights and clumsy capers of the principals are all wrong. As a typical Hayseed Duggan wouldn’t earn tuppence, while old Dad would figure better as a retired American multimillionaire."

Box office response was strong and there were a number of sequels starting with The Hayseeds Come to Sydney. It was the first feature from theatrical entrepreneur Beaumont Smith who went on to become one of Australia's most prolific filmmakers of the silent era.

In July 1920 it was announced the series was to be re-released after having been withdrawn for twelve months.

In 1925 a profile on Smith in Everyone's magazine stated, the film "is still asked for in the country and were it possible to re-issue this film —it is now ten years or more since it was taken —it would still have a popular appeal." The following year the same paper wrote "Beau made more ambitious productions after that; five, six and seven reelers; but I might not be far out in guessing that none of them returned any- where near an equal percentage of profit on the original investment."

== See also ==
- The Hayseeds Come to Sydney (1917)
- The Hayseeds' Back-blocks Show (1917)
- The Hayseeds' Melbourne Cup (1918)
- Townies and Hayseeds (1923)
- Prehistoric Hayseeds (1923)
- The Hayseeds (1933)
