= The Face at the Window =

The Face at the Window may refer to:

- The Face at the Window (play), a stage play by F. Brooke Warren
- The Face at the Window (1910 film)
- The Face at the Window (1912 film)
- The Face at the Window (1913 film)
- The Face at the Window (1914 film)
- The Face at the Window (1915 film)
- The Face at the Window (1919 film), based on the 1897 play
- The Face at the Window (1920 film), based on the 1897 play
- The Face at the Window (1932 film), a British film directed by Leslie S. Hiscott, based on the 1897 play
- The Face at the Window (1939 film), based on the 1897 play
- The Face at the Window (1998 film)
- The Face at the Window (2004 film)
