= Phil K. Walsh =

Phillip Kenny Walsh (died 11 May 1935), invariably referred to as Phil Walsh or Phil K. Walsh, was an Australian stage actor and producer who made several feature films which still exist, unusually for those made during the "silent era".

== History ==
Walsh was born in country New South Wales, perhaps the son of a gold miner. He grew up in Gundagai, Tumblong and Bathurst.

Between 1892 and 1895 he was with Edmund Duggan's "Her Majesty's Dramatic Company", touring La Tosca, F. R. C. Hopkins' All for Gold, Greta. His Natural Life and Robbery Under Arms. consistently receiving good notices. In 1893 he was with Irve Hayman's Criterion Dramatic Company, with Gorge Leitch in 1895 and the Macmahons' Lyceum company 1897–1898. He visited Dubbo in 1894 as an RAOB member and to oversee the Aloysian Dramatic Club's production of The Silver King, and later developed amateur theatre companies in Dubbo and Mudgee. He produced The Silver King for the dramatic society at Bourke in 1897.

In September 1902 Walsh and his wife "Miss Nellie Ogden" toured New Zealand for (Marian? Ford?) Willis. Later that year they left for America, having received offers to stage his plays The Bailiff and The Swanee River, and was well received. He joined Andrew Mack's company for the musical comedy Tom Moore, which played in San Francisco in 1905, though he was not in the cast when it toured Australia earlier in the year.

He returned to Australia in 1907 to stage-manage the Broadway comedy The Ragged Earl and melodrama Jack Shannon (in both of which he also had supporting roles) for Andrew Mack, under contract to J. C. Williamson, followed by a season with Mack in New Zealand. In 1910 Walsh toured his own company through New Zealand's South Island.

Walsh had various interests in America away from the stage. He had a ranch and a newspaper, which he edited, in Petaluma, California. When the US joined the Allies in the Great War he joined the Army. In 1920 he made a brief return to Australia with his wife and son, and decided to return to Australia for good, after he had settled his affairs back in the USA.

In 1921 he acted as assistant producer for Beaumont Smith's films While the Billy Boils' and The Gentleman Bushranger. In 1922 he was in Wagga, as road manager for J. C. Williamson's White-headed Boys touring company.

In 1923 he returned to Australia as manager of the Abbey Theatre company and an Irish variety troupe, this time permanently. He produced the highly successful silent film Around the Boree Log (1925) and tried to raise money from the citizens of Gunning for Love Blind from a novel by Flora Ann Timms (née McLean, died 1945), a resident of the town. His next film project was The Birth of White Australia, principal scenes for which (the Lambing Flat riots) were shot at Young, whose citizens had provided the bulk of the film's £5,000 budget (many millions in today's money). The film was screened on three successive nights for its premiere at Young, and never seen again until "discovered" gathering dust in the Young Town Hall in the 1960s.

In 1934 he was working with the Neutral Bay Players' Club, whose members included Max Osbiston. He died the following year in a private hospital and was buried privately.

== Personal ==
Walsh was for a time married to his stage partner "Miss Nellie Ogden" (26 March 1883 – 9 October 1939).

Ogden was a daughter of Richard D'Orsay Ogden and stage actress "Miss Helen Fergus" née Ferguson, and a stage performer from an early age.
Walsh and Ogden appeared together from Irving Hayman days, then as leads in several plays, notably The Irishman in 1901. She accompanied him to New Zealand in 1902, then to America, but she was back in Sydney by November 1903, and from 1904 she appeared as "Miss Nellie Ferguson". She was reported as having married John Dickenson on 3 July 1907 at Broken Hill, but later became the wife of actor/manager George E. Melrose, about whom little is known before 1908; and was still active in 1950.

Walsh was brought up in the Catholic church. James Patrick Walsh (c. 1853 – 5 February 1936), who had a furniture business in Summer Street, Orange, and a residence on Bathurst Road, was an older brother. Other siblings were M. R. Walsh of Bathurst and Mrs. J. Ryan of Newcastle, about whom nothing has yet been found.

In 1920 Walsh made a brief (perhaps several years) return to Australia with a wife and son before returning permanently. His newspaper obituary mentions his wife, Eva, about whom nothing has yet been found, but no mention of children.

It has not yet been discovered what his occupation was before earning a living on the stage. There is however an enigmatic reference to his involvement with "a law firm at Cootamundra", and several of his written works have a legal theme.

Some accounts describe him as being American and, in one, of having the rank of "Colonel in the American Army".

== Written works ==
- Walsh wrote several plays, including Swanee River and The Bailiff, the former being better known and reported as having an unbroken run of eleven months in London.
- His short story The Wife of the King's Counsel was published in serial form in the (Orange) Leader in 1920.
