= The Hayseeds Come to Sydney =

- Directed by: Beaumont Smith
- Written by: Beaumont Smith
- Produced by: Beaumont Smith
- Starring: Tal Ordell; Fred MacDonald
- Cinematography: A. O. Segerberg
- Production company: Beaumont Smith Productions
- Release date: 9 July 1917
- Running time: 4,000 feet
- Country: Australia
- Language: silent

The Hayseeds Come to Sydney (also known as The Hayseeds Come to Town) is a 1917 Australian rural comedy from director Beaumont Smith.

The second in the Hayseeds series of movies, is considered a lost film.

== Synopsis ==
In Stoney Creek, Dad Hayseed (Tal Ordell) wins £5,000 in the lottery and decides to take his family to Sydney. The group includes him, Mum, Sam, Jim (Fred MacDonald), Poppy, Molly, Bubs, Peter, Peter and Cousin Harold. They visit shops, theatres, the gardens, Town Hall, Taronga Zoo and White City. Someone tells them to walk in the middle of the road so none of the footpads that are supposed to wait around the corners could sandbag them. Dad goes surfing at Manly Beach and needs to be rescued.

The family meet Norah, a country girl who has gone to work at a low-class Woolloomooloo pub. Dad rescues Norah from the hands of some bad characters. Later on, Dad is enticed to the pub buy two spielers on the pretense that Norah needs him, and is drugged. Norah discovers the plot and tells Jim Hayseed and the rest of the boys, who arrive just in time to save Dad after a brawl. Dad then gets a letter from Tom announcing that old Spotty the cow has got a calf and that Mum's eggs are hatching. This makes them get homesick and they go home.

== Cast ==
- Fred MacDonald as Jim Hayseed
- Tal Ordell as Dad Hayseed
- Harry McDonna as Cousin Harold
- Gladys Leigh as Mrs Hayseed
- H.H. Wallace
- Jack Lennon
- Connie Metters
- Vera Spaull
- Cecil Haines
- Mattie Ive
- Beaumont Smith as man on railway station

== Production ==
After Our Friends, the Hayseeds, Smith was able to pre-sell this sequel to forty Sydney theatres by the end of that month.

This was the first film made by stage actor Fred MacDonald who played Dave Rudd on stage and in several films, notably for Ken G. Hall. The part of Jim Hayseed was similar to Dave Rudd.

The movie was filmed in and around Sydney in May 1917, with plenty of scenes of local landmarks such as Taronga Zoo and White City. It was claimed 100,000 people saw the movie being shot. During filming the sequence at Manly Beach, Tal Ordell almost drowned and had to be rescued by the cameraman.

== Release ==
The film was retitled The Hayseeds Come to Town in markets outside Sydney. It was followed by The Hayseeds' Back-blocks Show.

== Critical reception ==
Lone Hand said " The photography is an improvement on the" first film while "the plot of Hayseeds No. 2 is clearer and simpler than the usual film story, and though the characters have been made familiar by so many writers, there is always a welcome tor Outback when he comes to town."
