= Possum Paddock =

1921 film

- Directed by: Kate Howarde; Charles Villiers
- Written by: Kate Howarde; Charles Villiers
- Based on: play by Kate Howarde
- Produced by: Kate Howarde
- Starring: John Cosgrove
- Cinematography: Lacey Percival
- Release date: 29 January 1921
- Running time: 6,500 feet
- Country: Australia
- Language: silent

Possum Paddock is a 1921 Australian film based on a popular play by Kate Howarde. It was the first Australian feature film to be directed by a woman. Only portions of it survive today.

== Plot ==
Andrew "Dad" McQuade (John Cosgrove), a tough farmer, faces ruin because of a bank loan he cannot repay. He decides to sell a fifty-acre field called 'Possum Paddock' to his greedy neighbour, Dan Martin (James Martin). However, Hugh Bracken (Jack Kirby), who is dating McQuade's daughter, Nancy (Leslie Adrien), sells his car to pay off the old man's debts. He then discovers that a railway is to go through the paddock and is worth a fortune.

== Cast ==
- John Cosgrove as Andrew McQuade
- James Martin as Dan Martin
- Leslie Adrien as Nancy McQuade
- Jack Kirby as Hugh Bracken
- Kate Howarde

== Original play ==
The play, inspired by the success of On Our Selection, premiered in Sydney in 1919 and was a massive hit, touring for the next ten months. It starred John Cosgrove and Howarde herself, along with Fred MacDonald.

The play was revived a number of times over the years.

== Production ==
Howarde made the film in collaboration with actor Charles Villers. The adaptation turned the story into a more serious melodrama rather than a broad comedy.

It was shot at the Rushcutter's Bay studio established by Cosens Spencer. Many of the cast had appeared in the original stage production, including Howarde and her daughter Leslie Adrien, who played the female lead.

New South Wales censors insisted a subplot about an unmarried mother be cut, in particular a scene where she imagines throwing her baby into a river.

== Reception ==
Although the film appears to have been commercially successful, Howarde made no further films, preferring to concentrate on her theatre career.
