= Satan in Sydney =

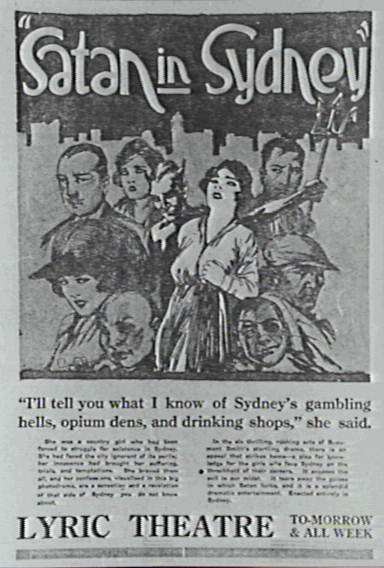
- Contemporary advertisement of film
- Directed by: Beaumont Smith
- Written by: Beaumont Smith
- Produced by: Beaumont Smith
- Starring: Elsie Prince; George Edwards
- Production company: Beaumont Smith's Productions
- Distributed by: Enterprise Film Exchange
- Release date: 15 July 1918
- Running time: 6 reels
- Country: Australia
- Language: silent

Satan in Sydney is a 1918 Australian melodrama from director Beaumont Smith. It was his first movie which was not about the rural family, the Hayseeds. It is considered a lost film.

== Synopsis ==
Country girl Anne Maxwell is receiving lessons from choir master Karl Krona, who is secretly a German sympathiser. Her step-sister, Betty Benton, tells Anne's father that she overheard Anne arranging to meet up with Krona in private. Mr Maxwell visits the church along with a minister and discovers Krona trying to kiss Anne against her will. Krona is fired from his job and Mr Maxwell tells Anne to leave home. She decides to make her living in Sydney and is followed there by her lover, Will Waybrn, who saves her from a house of ill repute.

War breaks out and Anne decides to become a nurse and serve overseas. Krona shaves off his moustache to pass as a Belgian and establishes an opium den in Chinatown to lure soldiers on the way to the front into deserting. He tricks Anne into entering it by forging a message from Betty Benton, but she is rescued by Will and his friends from the AIF. She eventually goes overseas to France, where she tends an injured Will; they are married and she is reunited with her father. The flirtatious Betty reforms; Krona is interned; and Anne and Will help recruiting while on honeymoon.

== Cast ==
- Elsie Prince as Anne Maxwell
- George Edwards as Will Wayburn
- Charles Villiers as Karl Kroner
- Zoe Angas
- Ruth Wainwright
- Gladys Leigh
- Percy Walshe
- Eileen Dawn
- Edward Jenner
- D.L. Dalziel
- Gerald Harcourt
- Mick Travey

== Production ==
Beaumont Smith had toured a play about Anglo-Chinese in 1914 called Mr Wu.

The film was made in Sydney.

== Release ==
The film had its first screening in Sydney at the Lyric Theatre, Sydney, at 11pm on 15 July 1918. One hour later, Inspector Fullerton ordered management to remove all billing and reported to the chief of police that certain parts of the film were likely to be objectionable to the Chinese community, and others would prejudice recruiting.

On 17 July the State Censor Board viewed the film and passed it without alteration. The State Recruiting Committee and military censor also watched the film and had no objections with it. The resulting publicity helped make the movie very popular at the box office.

The Chinese community, led by merchant William Yinson Lee, later complained that the film's advertising was offensive to Chinese. Some posters were accordingly removed.

Everyones magazine later stated:

It was censored by the police on its initial performance at the Lyric Theatre. It was only absent from the screen for a few brief hours whilst the censor-board met and decided that after all it was harmless, but the advertisement the incident brought in its train was priceless to Beaumont Smith. This is illustrative of his luck which so far has never deserted him. Many another man would have invented somehing of the sort, hoping to catch the censor’s eye and flopped horribly when he found that collection of individuals looking the other way when the incident appeared.
