= The Romance of Runnibede =

1928 film

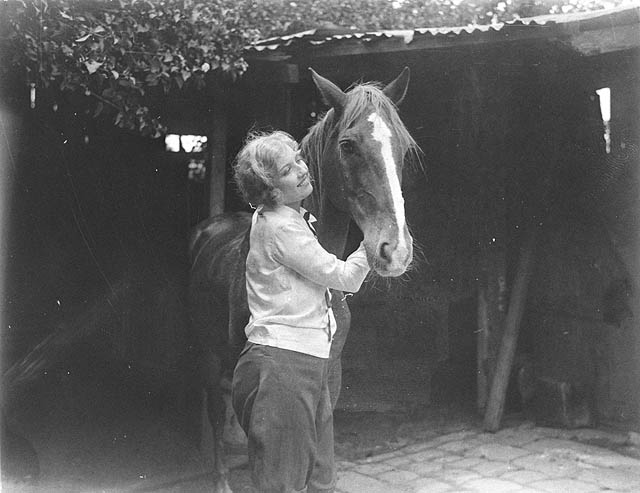
- Eva Novak on the set of the film
- Directed by: Scott R. Dunlap; William Reed; Wallace Worsley
- Written by: Gayne Dexter (titles); John M. Giles
- Based on: novel by Steele Rudd
- Produced by: Fred Philips
- Starring: Eva Novak; Gordon Collingridge
- Cinematography: Len Roos; Cliff Thomas
- Edited by: Cecil Hargreaves
- Production company: Phillips Films Productions
- Distributed by: Australasian Films; Union Theatres
- Release dates: 20 September 1927 (preview); 9 January 1928
- Running time: 6,000 feet
- Country: Australia
- Languages: Silent film; English intertitles
- Budget: £12,000 or £15,000
- Box office: £2,000

The Romance of Runnibede is a 1928 Australian silent film based on an incident in a book by Steele Rudd. Unlike many Australian silent movies, a copy of it exists today.

== Synopsis ==
Dorothy Winchester finishes four years of school and returns home to North Queensland where her father has a large station. She is kidnapped by a tribe of local aboriginals who believe she is the reincarnation of a queen. She is pursued by two men who love her: Tom Linton, a stockman on her father's property, and Sub-Inspector Dale, a mounted policeman. One of the men gives his life to save Dorothy.

== Cast ==
- Eva Novak as Dorothy Winchester
- Gordon Collingridge as Tom Linton
- Claude Sauders as Sub-Inspector Dale
- Roland Conway as Arthur Winchester
- Dunstan Webb as Goondai
- Marion Marcus Clarke as Miss Frazer
- Virginia Ainworth as Mrs Conley

== Production ==
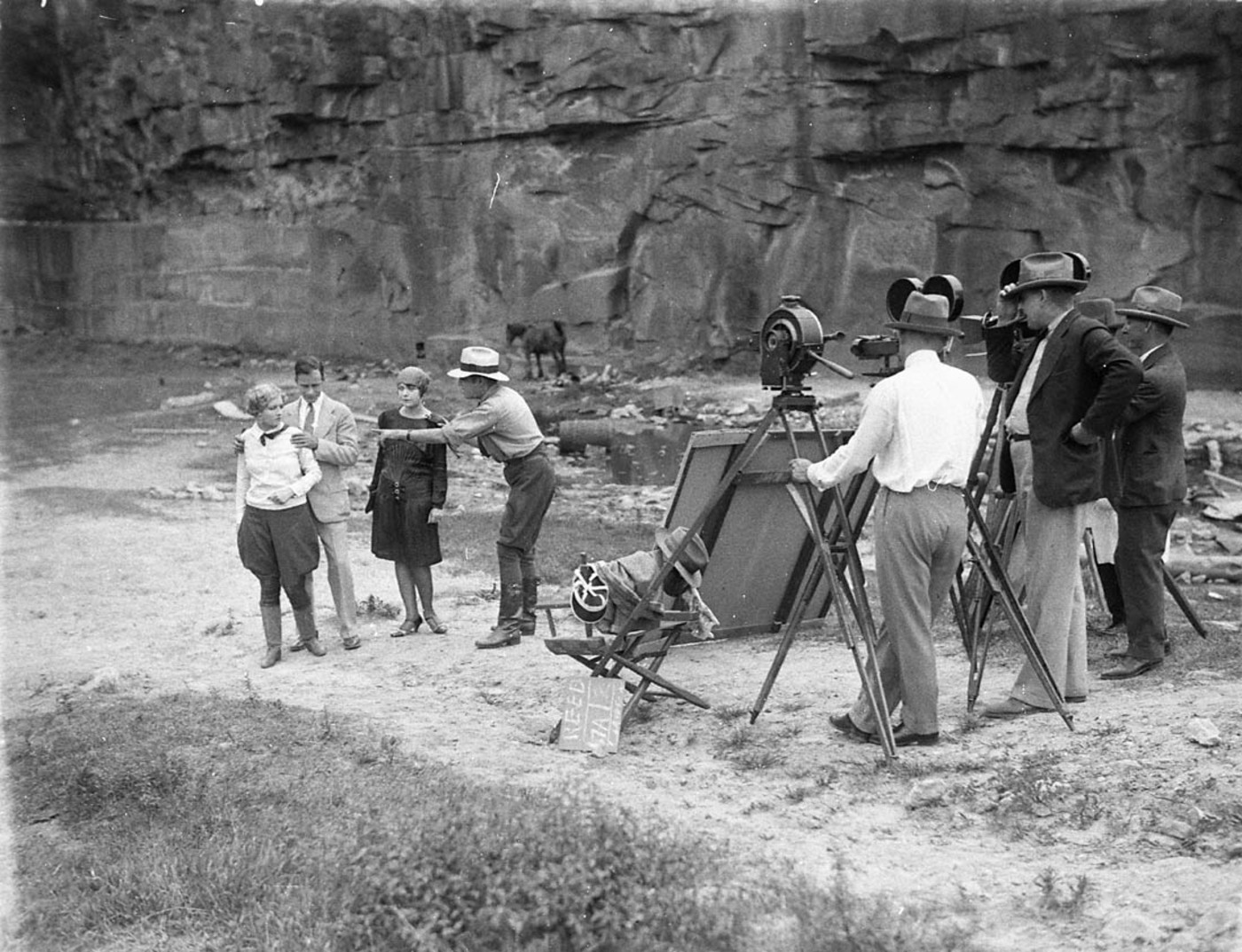
William Reed directs the filming of The Romance of Runnibede

A company was formed to make the film, Phillips Films Productions Ltd, with capital of £100,000. The prime mover behind it was American businessman Frederick Phillips, who succeeded raising the money when the industry was excited about the success of For the Term of His Natural Life (1927). Investors in the company included Steele Rudd and William Reed, Eva Novak's husband.

Several people were imported from America, including the director, Scott Dunlap, and star, Eva Novak. Dunlap's arrival was delayed so initial work was directed by William Reed. He received advice from Wallace Worsley, an American director visiting Australia at the time.

The movie was shot on location at an aboriginal reserve near Murgon in Queensland and in a studio at Rushcutters Bay.

== Reception ==
Phillips announced plans to map more films with Dunlap and gave evidence at the Royal Commission on the Moving Picture Industry in Australia that Australian industry did not require subsidy.

The film was previewed in Sydney in September 1927, seen by members of the Royal Commission, and was acclaimed by the critic from the Sydney Morning Herald who said it "deserves unqualified praise".

The film was given a special screening in the town of Murgon for Aboriginals only, with a number of people in the audience from the Barambah settlement where most of the film was made. According to The Bulletin:

The exuberance of the abos. as they recognised themselves on the screen was wild and loud. The outstanding actor in the film is Dunstan Webb, as an abo. medicine man. The obvious unreality of the picture’s theme may militate against its Australian success, but it should fare well enough overseas.

However Romance proved to be a major disappointment at the box office and by May 1928 the company was in liquidation.

Steele Rudd lost most of the money he invested and Eva Novak left Australia still owed £3,000 in salary.

The movie did obtain release in the UK in 1928.
