= Splendid Fellows =

1934 Australian film

- Original poster
- Directed by: Beaumont Smith; Raymond Longford (associate); Kenneth Brampton (dialogue)
- Written by: Beaumont Smith; Kenneth Brampton
- Produced by: Beaumont Smith
- Starring: Frank Leighton
- Cinematography: George D. Malcolm
- Edited by: Frank Coffey
- Production company: J.C. Williamson Picture Productions
- Distributed by: British Empire Films
- Release date: 2 May 1934
- Running time: 84 mins
- Country: Australia
- Language: English
- Budget: £5,000

Splendid Fellows is a 1934 Australian film from director Beaumont Smith about an Englishman (Frank Leighton) who comes to Australia. The cast includes Eric Colman, brother of Ronald Colman, and Sir Charles Kingsford Smith, who has a cameo as himself. It was Smith's last film.

== Plot ==
"Silly ass" Englishman Hubert Montmorency "Monty" Ralston goes to Australia after an argument with his father, accompanied by his valet, Thomson. In a Sydney two up parlour he befriends Australian farmer Jim McBride and goes with him to McBride's farm where he meets flying parson, Reverend Arthur Stanhope. He also falls for McBride's daughter, Eileen.

Monty persuades his father to buy a plane for the parson and enters it in the Centenary Air Race from London to Melbourne. While the race is in progress, Stanhope's old plane crashes and Monty flies to the rescue. A blind prospector, Blind Teddy, flying with the parson regains his sight and recognises a long-lost goldfield.

== Cast ==
- Frank Leighton as The Hon. Hubert Montmorency Ralston
- Leo Franklyn as Thompson
- Frank Bradley as Jim McBride
- Eric Colman as Reverend Arthur Stanhope
- Isabelle Mahon as Eileen McBride
- Peggy Ross as Mrs McBride
- Bill Stewart as Teddy Lawson)
- Andrew Higginson as Lord Ralston
- Madge Aubrey as Mrs Brogan
- Charles Zoli as Signor Spigoni
- Sir Charles Kingsford Smith as himself

== Production ==
The film was shot at the studios of Cinesound Productions in Rushcutter's Bay, Sydney in July and August 1934. It was originally entitled The Big Race but was retitled after an American film of that name was announced.

Footage of the real Centenary Air Race was incorporated, as was that of the landing of C. W. A. Scott and Tom Campbell Black at Laverton, and the arrival of the Duke of Gloucester to Melbourne. This meant the movie was not actually completed until October.

Raymond Longford was an assistant director.

Isabelle Mahon was a 17-year-old actor who had appeared on stage in Gay Divorce.

== Reception ==
When the film was in post-production, Smith announced plans to make another feature, in New Zealand, "a modern drama with a sporting theme and glimpses of Māori life." However, Splendid Fellows was a commercial disappointment on release and led to Smith's permanent retirement from film production. Reviews were mixed.

Everyones, trade paper for the Australian industry, later wrote, "Letters to the dailies insist upon a departure from such hoary old warriors as Selection, The Dean and The Hayseeds: and from reliance upon Wallace and Mo as true Australian-type comedians. Yet when Beau Smith responds to the alleged demand for a modern theme and real human beings, by turning out the creditable Splendid Fellows, the public expresses its undying gratitude with a swift kick in the pants."
