= Mona Donaldson =

Australian film editor

- Born: Mona Emily Donaldson; October 1901; New South Wales, Australia
- Died: 12 December 1985 (aged 84); Kirribilli, New South Wales, Australia
- Occupation: Film editor
- Spouse: Keith Murray

Mona Donaldson (October 1901 – 12 December 1985) was an Australian film editor who was active during the 1920s and 1930s.

== Biography ==
Donaldson began working for Australasian Films in Sydney when she was a teenager, and two years later took a job at Paramount as a film examiner and booking clerk.

After taking a break from the industry to take care of her sick mother, she got a job as a film editor at Australasian. She did not receive credit on her earliest editing jobs for directors like Alexis Albert, Frank Hurley, and Arthur Shirley. Editing on 1927's For the Term of His Natural Life was originally attributed solely to Katherine Dawn, but it was later revealed that it was Donaldson's work.

She left Australasian in 1928 to work with Lacey Percival at Automatic Film Laboratories, where she spent the subsequent 18 years. During that time she was also contracted to Charles Chauvel to re-cut Heritage (1935) and edit Uncivilised (1936).

She retired from editing after a lengthy illness in 1947, and opened her own millinery shop. In 1972, she married Keith Murray, who she had known for years.

Donaldson died on 12 December 1985 at Kirribilli, New South Wales.

== Selected filmography ==
- Pearls and Savages (1921)
- Painted Daughters (1925)
- Tall Timber (1926)
- Hills of Hate (1926)
- The Pioneers (1926)
- For the Term of His Natural Life (1927)
- The Grey Glove (1928)
- The Adorable Outcast, released with synchronised sound in the United States as Black Cargoes of the South Seas (1928)
- Showgirl's Luck (1931)
- Heritage (1935 re-cut)
- Rangle River (1936)
- Uncivilised (1936)
