= Gordon Collingridge =

Australian actor

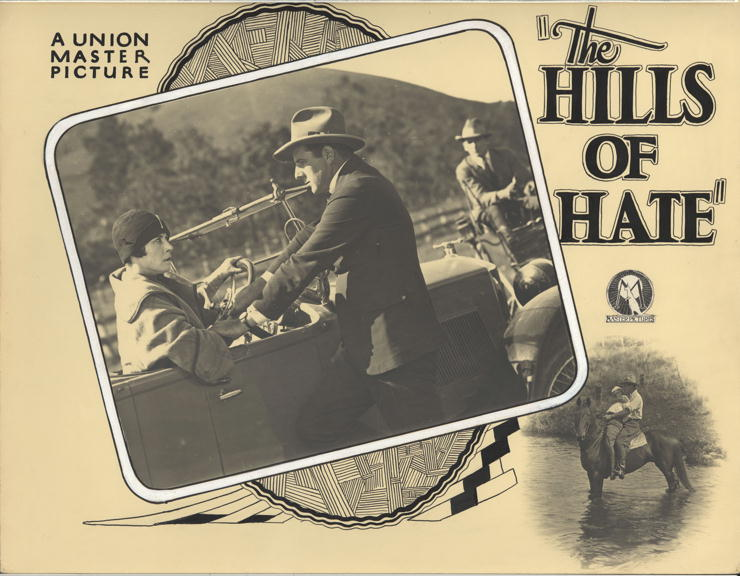
Lobby card from Hills of Hate (1926) with Dorothy Gordon and Gordon Collingridge

Gordon Collingridge was an Australian actor during the silent film era. He played many matinee idol type roles, most notably for director Beaumont Smith and opposite Louise Lovely in Jewelled Nights (1925). Lovely called him "the male screen star to the manner born."

He had spent a number of years working on Queensland stations.

== Selected filmography ==
- Circumstance (1922)
- Townies and Hayseeds (1923)
- Prehistoric Hayseeds (1923)
- The Dingo (1923)
- The Digger Earl (1924)
- Dope (1924)
- Joe (1924)
- Jewelled Nights (1925)
- Hills of Hate (1926)
- The Romance of Runnibede (1928)
- Trooper O'Brien (1928)
