= Tal Ordell =

Australian actor (1880–1948)

Talone Ordell (1880 – 1948), better known as Tal Ordel, was an Australian actor, writer and director. Ordell was probably born in Calcutta, India, seventh child of Victorian-born parents William Odell Raymond Buntine, drover, and his wife Susanna, née Mawley. He worked extensively on stage and screen as an actor in the 1910s and 1920s, playing Dad Rudd twice for Raymond Longford and Dad Hayseed – a similar role – three times for Beaumont Smith. He was the original "Ginger Mick" in the stage version of The Sentimental Bloke. He toured Australia with Marie Tempest.

He turned director with The Kid Stakes (1927), based on the cartoon character Fatty Finn. In the 1930s, he worked more in radio as a writer and actor. His son Robin, who was killed during the Second World War, worked with him on the film and radio projects.

== Select filmography ==
- The Hayseeds' Back-blocks Show (1917)
- The Hayseeds Come to Sydney (1917)
- The Hayseeds' Melbourne Cup (1918)
- On Our Selection (1920)
- The Man from Snowy River (1920)
- Silks and Saddles (1920) – actor
- Cows and Cuddles (1921) (short) – director
- The Gentleman Bushranger (1921) – actor
- Rudd's New Selection (1921) – actor
- While the Billy Boils (1921) – actor
- The Kid Stakes (1927) – actor, writer, producer, director
- The Sentimental Bloke (1932) – actor
- The Hayseeds (1933) – actor
- Harvest Gold (1945) – actor

== Select theatre credits ==
- On Our Selection – actor
- The Sentimental Bloke – actor
- Kangaroo Flat (1926) – author
