= Olga Agnew =

Australian child actress

- Agnew with the cast of Our Friends, the Hayseeds circa 1917
- Born: 1899; Waverley, New South Wales, Australia
- Died: 18 August 1987 (aged 87–88); Belrose, New South Wales, Australia
- Occupation: Actress
- Years active: 1912–21

Olga Agnew (1899 – 18 August 1987) was an Australian child actress, who starred in multiple plays and one movie from 1912 to 1920.

Agnew performed predominantly in shows directed by Beaumont Smith, including the theatrical adaption of Seven Little Australians (1914–15) and the silent film Our Friends, the Hayseeds (1917), and other productions such as The Sign of the Cross (1916–19), The Silence of Dean Maitland (1918) and Oliver Twist (1920). By 1917 Agnew had become one of Australia's biggest child actors, and at this time was also doing shows in New Zealand.

Agnew at that point 22 years of age, performed her final show The Ever Open Door on 3 December 1921, a year after her father's death from tuberculosis, Agnew retired from acting not long after. That same year, she became engaged to Benjamin Peter Ross but they never married.

Agnew would spend the next 50 years working various jobs around the Sydney area before permanently retiring around 1970. She never married and had no children.

Agnew died on 18 August 1987, and was cremated at Northern Suburbs Memorial Gardens in Sydney.

== Stage work ==
- Seven Little Australians (1914)
- The Sign of the Cross (1916–19)
- The Silence of Dean Maitland (1918)
- Oliver Twist (1920)

== Filmography ==
- Our Friends, the Hayseeds (1917)
