= The Man from Snowy River (1920 film) =

1920 film

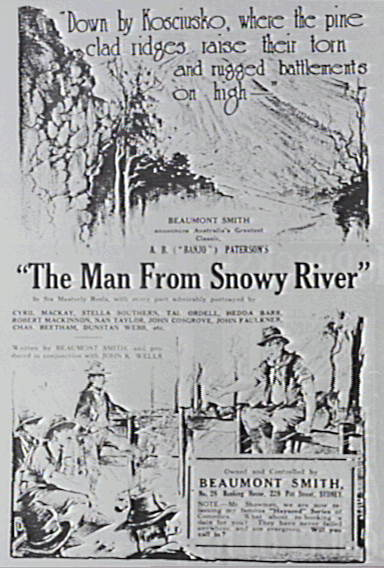
- Original advertisement
- Directed by: Beaumont Smith; John K Wells
- Written by: Beaumont Smith
- Based on: poem The Man from Snowy River by Banjo Paterson
- Produced by: Beaumont Smith
- Starring: Cyril Mackay; Stella Southern; Tal Ordell; Hedda Barr; John Cosgrove
- Cinematography: Lacey Percival; Al Burne
- Production company: Beaumont Smith's Productions
- Distributed by: Beaumont Smith Films
- Release date: 28 August 1920
- Running time: 5,500 feet
- Country: Australia
- Language: English

The Man from Snowy River is a 1920 film made in Australia. The film was silent and filmed in black and white, and was based on the Banjo Paterson poem of the same name.

It is considered a lost film.

== Plot ==
A country boy, Jim Conroy, is living a dissolute life in the city, running around with vamp Helen Ross. When his father cuts him off, he is dumped by Helen and returns to the bush.

Jim works for a corrupt squatter, Stingey Smith, and falls in love with Kitty Carewe, daughter of John Carewe, the squatter next door. John is impressed with Jim's skill with a horse and invites him to train his finest horse, "Swagman", hoping to win enough prize money to save his farm.

A jealous farm hand plots with Smith to fix the race so that the latter can take over the Carewe farm, letting "Swagman" go and run with the brumbies. However Jim rescues the horse and rides it to victory.

Smith frames Jim for theft but he is proved innocent and Jim marries Kitty.

== Cast ==
- Cyril Mackay as Jim Conroy
- Stella Southern as Kitty Carewe
- Tal Ordell as Stingey Smith
- Hedda Barr as Helen Ross
- John Cosgrove as Saltbush Bill
- Robert MacKinnon as Dick Smith
- John Faulkner as John Carewe
- Charles Beetham as Bill Conroy
- Dunstan Webb as Ryan
- Nan Taylor as Mrs Potts
- James Coleman as Trooper Scott
- Con Berthal as cook

== Production ==
=== Development ===
Beaumont Smith bought the film rights to all the works of Banjo Paterson and spent two years writing a script. The copyright was held by Angus Robertson in entirety but they passed some of the money on to Paterson. The price for the rights to the poem was reportedly the second largest ever paid in the history of Australian filmmaking, only exceeded by The Sentimental Bloke.

Smith incorporated characters from various Paterson works, including squatter's daughter, Kitty Carewe, and swagman, Saltbush Bill. The character of Helen Ross, however, was Smith's original invention.

Smith later claimed the price of the film rights was the highest ever that had been paid in Australian cinema, with the exception of The Sentimental Bloke (1919).

In January 1919 Snowy Baker announced he would star in the film based on Smith's script. It was reported that "a start has already been made with the picture on Mr. Erie McKellar's station, where every facility is offered for the aiming of such thrills as the great ride from "Rio Grande," the bushranging scenes from "Conroy's Gap," and the tight from "Salt Bush Bill". Smith said the film would incorporate matters he had learned in America and would be released via E.J. Carroll. However Baker wound up not appearing in the film.

In May 1919 Smith announced he had delayed plans to make the film, unhappy with the rates of return he could get from exhibitors.

In November 1919 Smith announced he would make the movie in Hollywood, as an attempt to break into the US market. The Bulletin reported that "Smith, who has turned out more winners than any other producer in this country, reckons that unless fresh arrangements are made by the booking houses the day of the Australian film is numbered."

He left in December 1919 but returned to Sydney within six months, bringing back with him a documentary about Hollywood, A Journey through Filmland, which he released in Sydney in February 1921. Smith later said he could not find the right "Australian types" in America. In March 1920 Smith announced he would make the film in Australia. In May 1920 it was reported fIlming was delayed by the unavailability of film stock.

=== Casting ===
Smith used American talent available in Australia, including John K. Wells, who was assisting Wilfred Lucas on the Snowy Baker movies, and visiting actress Hedda Barr. (At one stage it was announced Snowy Baker would star but this did not eventuate.)

Cyril Mackay was a stage actor who had retired after suffering a nervous breakdown. He came out of retirement to play the role.

The movie marks the film debut of movie star Stella Southern, who was working as a shop girl when discovered by Smith; he gave her the name for this film.

Heda Barr was an American touring the country.

"I believe it to be absolutely real", said Smith, "honest Australian, without any artificiality, burlesque, or exaggeration of types. There are no bushrangers, there are only true Australian people, and the film is as clear as the air of Kosciusko itself, and I believe the public will like it be cause of this".

=== Shooting ===
Shooting began in June 1920 on location at Mulgoa, Wallacia and Luddenham in the Blue Mountains. The cast and crew consisted of eighteen people.

In order to obtain footage for the climactic race, Smith held a race day and invited horsemen from the local area to participate in four races at Luddenham. Mackay was injured during filming.

Location filming was done down in the Snowy River country near Cooma.

In July 1920 it was reported the film was Smith's most expensive to date.

== Release ==
The movie was first released in Brisbane, then in other states.

Smith's father helped distribute the film through New South Wales.

== Reception ==
=== Critical ===
Smith's Weekly praised the movie saying it had:

Charming scenery, helped by clever photography and lighting. The story i» wholesomely exciting, with touches of kindly humour. The acting is excellent, though no great demands are made on those concerned...Mr. Smith is wise to show bush folk in an attractive light, whilst sacrificing nothing of the Australian atmosphere. Here, at last, is a picture, not only for local consumption, but one that will be welcomed overseas.

Everyone's called the film:

A top-notch Australian production that revives one’s hopes for the establishment of a great movie industry in the Commonwealth. Beaumont Smith shows... what can be done with Australian scenery for backgrounds, and an Australian poem as the pivot for an interesting plot characterised by quick action. The personalities of Paterson’s verses are skillfully interwoven with a story into which the woman interest "is cleverly introduced... City and country alike will hail The Man from Snowy River scenically, and in both photographic and acting senses as the best Australian movie yet.

Perth Call declared the film "far ahead of any previous Australian efforts. Story, photography, acting, and scenery equal any American effort, the whole six reels being flaw less. If there is any fault it is in over-stressing drought expediences which are calculated to give outsiders the impression that drought conditions are chronic and general. With this modified the film may be presented abroad without any misgivings as to the verdict on Australian ability to present .perfect pictures."

The Sun wrote "Perhaps the greatest charm of the picture lies in its scenic qualities. Magnificent "long shots" of picturesque crags and valleys, and broad sweeps of pasture land, are a feature of the production, and the equal in photographic accomplishment of any work of a similar nature that has come from America."

The Sunday Times wrote the film "can gracefully wear all the superlatives that may be hung upon it. It is superior to 7-10ths of the imported films seen here, and for natural scenic beauties and clear photography has been surpassed by none... The crowning virtue of this film is its length; it is just sufficiently long to hold the interest, and does not drag at any time. No attempt has been made to pad for the sake of extra feet."

== Re-edit ==
In 1922 Smith took a re-edited version to England. The film received a poor review in the trade papers and struggled to find distribution.

=== Proposed sequel ===
When Smith finished the film he announced plans for a sequel Clancy of the Overflow. but this was never made.

== See also ==
- Snowy River

== Notes ==
- "The Dictionary of Performing Arts in Australia – Theatre . Film . Radio . Television – Volume 1" – Ann Atkinson, Linsay Knight, Margaret McPhee – Allen & Unwin Pty. Ltd., 1996
