= Fred MacDonald =

Australian actor

Fred MacDonald (1895–1968), was an Australian actor best known for playing Dave Rudd opposite Bert Bailey on stage and screen, starting with the original 1912 production of On Our Selection. He also played a similar role, Jim Hayseed, several times on screen for director Beaumont Smith.

== Biography ==
MacDonald was born in Scotland and moved to Australia when he was four. He established himself as a matinee idol on stage, acting with the Allan Wilkie Shakespeare Company. He first appeared opposite Bert Bailey in a comic part in The Shamrock and the Rose. He hit it off with Bailey, who cast him in On Our Selection.

Bailey and MacDonald also appeared on stage together in The Sentimental Bloke, playing Ginger Mick and the title role respectively. MacDonald also featured in Possum Paddock originating the role of Bill McQuade.

In addition to his stage and film performances, MacDonald worked extensively in Melbourne radio.

== Select filmography ==
- The Hayseeds' Back-blocks Show (1917)
- The Hayseeds Come to Sydney (1917)
- The Hayseeds' Melbourne Cup (1918)
- On Our Selection (1932)
- The Squatter's Daughter (1933)
- The Silence of Dean Maitland (1934)
- Grandad Rudd (1935)
- Dad and Dave Come to Town
- Dad Rudd, MP (1940)
