= While the Billy Boils =

While the Billy Boils may refer to:

- While the Billy Boils (film), a 1921 Australian film
- While the Billy Boils (short story collection), an 1896 collection of short stories by Henry Lawson
