= Katie Howard =

Katie Howard may refer to:

- The lead in the 1950 film Comanche Territory
- A character on That '80s Show

== See also ==
- Kate Howard, fictional character in General Hospital
- Kat Howard
- Kate Howarde
- Kathy Howard (born 1958), American artistic gymnast
- Catherine Howard (disambiguation)
