= Around the Boree Log and Other Verses =

1921 poetry collection by John O'Brien

- Title page for Around the Boree Log and Other Verses (1946)
- Author: John O'Brien
- Language: English
- Genre: Poetry collection
- Publisher: Angus and Robertson
- Publication date: 1921
- Publication place: Australia
- Media type: Print
- Pages: 162 pp.

Around the Boree Log and Other Verses is a collection of poems by Australian writer John O'Brien, published by Angus and Robertson in 1921.

The collection contains 46 poems which were published in a variety of original publications, with some being published here for the first time.

A film, titled Around the Boree Log, was released in 1925 using O'Brien's poems as its base.

== Contents ==
- "Around the Boree Log"
- "Calling to Me"
- "The Little Irish Mother"
- "One by One"
- "Ten Little Steps and Stairs"
- "The Trimmin's on the Rosary"
- "The Birds Will Sing Again"
- "The Old Bush School"
- "Six Brown Boxer Hats"
- "The Libel"
- "When the Circus Came to Town"
- "His Father"
- "The Kookaburras"
- "Peter Nelson's Fiddle"
- "The Church upon the Hill"
- "Currajong"
- "The Helping Hand"
- "Vale, Father Pat"
- "Josephine"
- "The Old Mass Shandrydan"
- "Pitchin' At the Church"
- "Said Hanrahan"
- "The Tidy Little Body"
- "The Pillar of the Church"
- "Teddo Wells, Deceased"
- "Norah O'Neill"
- "The Presbytery Dog"
- "Tangmalangaloo"
- "The Alter-Boy"
- "At Casey's after Mass"
- "St. Patrick's Day"
- "The Careys"
- "When Old Man Carey Died"
- "The Parting Rosary"
- "Ownerless"
- "Laughing Mary"
- "Moryah"
- "A Stranger in the Church"
- "Tell Me, What's a Girl to Do?"
- "The Wiree's Song"
- "Wisha, What is the Matter with Jim"
- "Said the White-Haired Priest"
- "Honeymooning from the Country"
- "Making Home"
- "Could I Hear the Kookaburras Once Again"
- "Come, Sing Australian Songs to Me!"

== Critical reception ==
Writing in Freeman's Journal J. M. Cusack welcomed the collection and commented: "The 'Boree,' the author tells us is one of the best fire woods in Australia. So he gathers us in an old bush home on a cold, wet night, pokes up the boree fire, and lets 'the doves of fancy loose to bill and coo again.' The poems are told and are to be read as a series of stories narrated round the fire...The poems are Australian, and set the heart roaming away over our wild, weird wastes of sunburnt country, over our sweeping plains and ragged mountain ranges. Though he has painted his country in glory, he has not forgotten the grand old pioneers–the Irish mothers and fathers, who have written big deeds on the early pages of Australian history, a fact no true Australian will forget...The poems are full of things wondrously beautiful, while lines which are sparkling gems glisten here and there, on every page."

The collection was also appreciated by a reviewer in The Age: "Certainly Irish sentiment and temperament are very evident. The verses are written in fine, swinging measure, but the writer is something more than a clever versifier. Many of the pieces contain real poetry. Although the beauty of bush home life and the charm of religious faith, are almost his exclusive themes, the writer touches a wide range of human emotions. The brave mothers who struggle so quietly and effectively in the backblocks inspire him to his finest efforts. In humor and pathos he is equally versatile. Occasionally a word or line is transparently due to the exigencies of rhyme but many phrases are strikingly apt and beautiful."

== See also ==
- 1921 in Australian literature
