= Tall Timber (1926 film) =

1926 film

- Directed by: Dunstan Webb
- Written by: Dunstan Webb
- Based on: story by Louis Esson
- Starring: Eden Landeryou; Billie Sim
- Cinematography: Lacey Percival
- Edited by: Mona Donaldson
- Production companies: Australasian Films; A Master Picture
- Distributed by: Union Theatres
- Release date: 21 August 1926
- Running time: 7,000 feet
- Country: Australia
- Languages: Silent film English intertitles
- Budget: £3,000 or £8,000

Tall Timber is a 1926 Australian silent film about a rich man who flees the city and works in a timber mill. It is considered a lost film.

In 1937, Cinesound Productions, the company that followed Australasian Films under the Greater Union banner, made a feature film partly set against the timber industry called Tall Timbers. It was directed by Ken G. Hall and had no connection to the 1926 Tall Timber.

== Synopsis ==
Jack Maxwell, son of a wealthy stockbroker, is disowned by his father after hosting a raucous party at a cabaret that is raided by the police. He goes to work at a mill in the North Coast timber district owned by his friend Dick Desmond.

Jack falls in love with Betty Manning, the daughter of the widow who cooks for the workers, and clashes with Steve Black, the ganger of the mill who is behind a spate of timber robberies, who also loves Betty.

A sundowner arrives in camp and shoots Steve in revenge for seducing the sundowner's wife years ago. He also reveals Steve has been blackmailing Dick's father for a murder for which he can now be proved innocent.

Jack saves the mill from a robbery and is offered a partnership from Desmond.

== Cast ==
The Herald 15 November 1926

- Billie Sim as Betty Manning
- Eden Landeryou as Jack Maxwell
- George Willoughby as John Maxwell Snr
- Claude Holland as Dick Desmond
- Big Bill Wilson as Steve Black
- Jimmy McMahon as Jimmy Manning
- Charles Beetham as Desmond Fox
- Dan Gallagher as Dan
- Nellie Ferguson as Mrs Manning
- Ray Watson as Agnes Esdale
- J.P. O'Neill as sundowner
- Bill Murray as burglar

== Production ==
In 1925 Universal announced they would make a film Tall Timber based on a novel by Gordon Goodchild, directed by Lynn Reynolds.

In December 1925 Australasian Pictures announced they would make their own Tall Timbers. It was directed by the actor Dunstan Webb, who later also made The Grey Glove for Australasian Films. At one stage he was also mentioned as a possible director of For the Term of His Natural Life (1927), but he wound up just appearing in it as an actor.

The film was part of a slate of medium budgeted movies from Australasian which also included The Pioneers, Hills of Hate, Sunrise and The Grey Glove. These would be followed by larger budgeted productions For the Term of His Natural Life and The Adorable Outlaw.

=== Shooting ===
The film was shot on location on the New South Wales coast in Langley Vale and in studios at Sydney. Filming started on location in December 1925. According to Everyone's, the story was "a strong one, and introduces the local lumbering industry to the screen for the first time."

In February 1926 a number of state politicians from the New South Wales Legislative Council were invited to visit the set at Bondi Junction. Filming was well publicized and proceeded on a relatively lavish scale.

== Reception ==
Sydney Sun 23 August 1926

=== Critical ===
The Sydney Morning Herald's reviewer felt the film too closely followed an American model, but wrote that the timber sequences were "more characteristically Australian and contain patches of tolerable melodrama." According to this review, the weakest point of the film was the captions (which had been written by Jim Donald, a Sydney journalist).

Everyone's magazine was more enthusiastic, reporting that the film:

Easily ranks amongst the best of local productions to date. Credit goes to Dunstan Webb, who thus notches success for his first ambitious effort... The story holds interest throughout. It is set amid the everyday working of a little known industry, and is acted quite intelligently by a small and almost unknown band of players. Despite this fact both story and acting are gripping and Australasian Films Ltd. need by no means be ashamed of this, their latest contribution to local endeavour. The exterior scenes are all excellently conceived and the natural comedy introduced by medium of a clever boy, adds welcome relief to the heavier passages of the story.

The Bulletin also reported that "the photography is good, and the picture will stand against the ruck of American films; but the ill-written captions are a handicap. That is a detail of picture-production to which Australian producers need to give better attention."

=== Box office ===
Everyones later stated that the film was a box office success. "At the box-offices it proved a consistent puller."

=== English release ===
The movie was the only film made by Australasian Films between 1925–27 to receive a cinema release in England. It counted as a British film under the local quota laws and was distributed there by Universal.

It was sold to the UK outright for £300. Everyone's stated this was "a low figure; nevertheless the picture had already earned good money in Australia." The film went on to be "a big box office success" in England, according to Everyone's.

== Proposed remake ==
In 1932 it was announced Cinesound Productions - a company which evolved out of Australasian Films - would remake Tall Timber, along with another 1920s Australasian Films movie, The Pioneers. This was not done. However Cinesound did make a new film set in the timber industry, Tall Timbers, which came out in 1937.
