= Reunion Day (film) =

1962 British TV movie

Reunion Day is a 1962 British TV movie based on a script by Australian writer Peter Yeldham. Many of the cast were Australians living in London at the time. It was done by the BBC. However the play was banned from being shown in Australia.

== Cast ==
- Ray Barrett
- Reg Lye as Carmody
- Ron Haddrick as Dave Rubin
- Nyree Dawn Porter
- Ken Wayne as Jack Hudson
- Frank Leighton aa Judith Rubin
- Madge Ryan as Grace

== Production ==
Yeldham wrote it in the summer of 1961, in London. It took him a month but he had the idea for three years.

== Reception ==
The play was successful, particularly in Germany.

== Australian Banning ==
The ABC rejected the play on the grounds it was too similar to The One Day of the Year.

The play was to have been shown on BTQ-7, TCN-9 in Sydney and HSV-7 in Melbourne. However the censor refused to pass it. Chief censor C.J. Campbell said the play "contained matter that was quite contrary to the Broadcasting Control Board's standards for television. The language used may be all right for a soldier's reunion but it is all wrong for a suburban sitting room."

Ron Haddrick said "there were only three 'bloodys' in the whole play. I was shocked and upset when I heard the play had been banned here." Ray Barrett wrote a letter to the Sydney Morning Herald saying he was "appalled and amazed that this play has been banned... It is a true and honest comment on men's difficulty to settle down after the war. This is not a play attacking the RSL or, in fact, the tradition of the reunion, but a play of life."

A spokesman for TCN-9 said:

Reunion Day depicts Anzac Day as just another excuse for a debauch. There is no remembrance of Gallipoli, or sacrifice. The action takes place almost entirely in a pub. The language goes from bad to worse. The characters have nothing in common. The conversation runs out every two or three minutes, and somebody says: 'Let's have a drink'. There is even a dose of anti-Semitism thrown in. The whole thing was blasphemous, obscene and thoroughly nasty. If we had shown it we would have had the RSL marching on us and not without justice. We would have appealed against the censor's ruling if we had thought the play was worth it. We didn't.

In 1966 Yeldham said "there's a local shyness about the RSL and attitudes to the Vietnam campaign. Not that it attacks the institution of Anzac Day. It is a study of old comrades who find they have carried memories beyond reality. But it is relevant to Australian life, and if anyone does produce it here, I'll donate the fee to the Australian Writer's Guild." This did not happen.

According to Filmink in the early days of Australian television "It took a genuine act of will to produce local stories for television and sometimes people were punished for doing so," giving responses to Reunion Day and The Multi-Coloured Umbrella as examples.

== 2022 Reading ==
The play was given a public reading in 2022, shortly before Yeldham's death.

== Notes ==
- Yeldham, Peter (2009). "Reunion Day Complete Script". Journal of the Association for the Study of Australian Literature.
