= John Cosgrove (actor) =

Australian actor (1867–1925)

John Cosgrove (1867 – 11 August 1925) was an Australian male actor, writer and director who worked in theatre and films during the silent era. He sometimes collaborated with Bland Holt.

== Personal life ==
Cosgrove had a turbulent personal life. He would borrow money so often he was nicknamed "The Great Australian Bite". His first daughter died when a few days old. Another daughter, Noel, died of tuberculosis at the age of nineteen. His son Bill died in a plane crash in 1943.

== Filmography ==
- The Luck of Roaring Camp (1911)
- The Right to Love (1915)
- The Noon Hour (1915)
- The Turning Point (1915)
- For Love of Mary Ellen (1915)
- Queen of the Band (1915)
- The Ever Living Isles (1915)
- The Wayward Son (1915)
- Desert Gold (1919)
- Barry Butts In (1919)
- The Man from Snowy River (1920)
- Silks and Saddles (1921) – also story
- Possum Paddock (1921)
- The Betrayer (1921)
- The Queen of Sheba (1921)
- The Guyra Ghost Mystery (1921) – also directed
- While the Billy Boils (1921)
- The Gentleman Bushranger (1921)
- Sunshine Sally (1922) – script
