= The Guyra Ghost Mystery =

1921 film

- Directed by: John Cosgrove
- Written by: John Cosgrove
- Produced by: John Cosgrove
- Starring: John Cosgrove; Nellie Regan
- Cinematography: A.J. Moulton
- Production companies: Cogrove and Regan
- Release date: 25 June 1921
- Running time: five reels
- Country: Australia
- Language: silent

The Guyra Ghost Mystery is a 1921 Australian film written and directed by John Cosgrove. It was based on the real-life 1921 mystery of the Guyra Ghost.

It is considered a lost film.

== Plot ==
In Guyra, New South Wales, the Bowen family are visited by ghosts. Sherlock Doyle, an expert in ghosts, goes to the town to investigate.

== Cast ==
- John Cosgrove as Sherlock Doyle
- Nellie Regan
- Minnie Bowen
- the Bowen family

== Background ==
The film is based on actual events. In April 1921, the family of William Bowen in Guyra reported knocking on the walls and stones being thrown on their roof. This continued even when police and volunteers guarded the house. A friend of Sir Arthur Conan Doyle, then touring Australia, visited to help investigate.

One of the children, Minnie Bowen, later confessed to throwing some stones and it is thought that practical jokers were behind it, but the mystery was never completely solved. Since then, the mystery has continued to persist, including media released around the centenary.

== Production ==
The story became a media sensation in 1921 and several film projects based on it were announced but this was the only one made. It was partly funded by a Guyra exhibitor and shot on location in the town. Cosgrove reportedly arrived in the town in May 1921, accompanied by a cameraman, and approached the Bowens directly asking for their co operation in making the film. They were reluctant at first but eventually agreed.

The Bowen family themselves appear in the cast. It is unknown, however, if any other actual participants or internal locations were used. The character of Sherlock Doyle was a spoof of Mr Moors, a friend of Sir Arthur Conan Doyle.

Shooting took place in May."SYDNEY GOSSIP". Goulburn Evening Penny Post. New South Wales, Australia. 24 May 1921. p. 1 (EVENING) – via National Library of Australia. One report says it was three days., another two weeks.

The film, with a runtime of approximately 50 minutes, was advertised as containing "five reels of laughter" indicating it was a comedy. The Bowens did not appear in the advertising posters.

== Reception ==
The movie performed poorly at the box office. It was the only director credit for actor John Cosgrove, although he wrote the scripts of several other movies.

"Should interest those who believe in ghosts," said one review.

The film did not appear to be widely seen. One report said it "sat on the shelf" for three years.
