= Prehistoric Hayseeds =

1923 film

- Directed by: Beaumont Smith
- Written by: Beaumont Smith
- Produced by: Beaumont Smith
- Starring: Hector St Clair; Gordon Collingridge
- Cinematography: Lacey Percival
- Production company: Beaumont Smith Productions
- Distributed by: Beaumont Smith
- Release date: 24 November 1923
- Running time: 5,000 feet
- Country: Australia
- Language: silent

Prehistoric Hayseeds is a 1923 Australian film comedy that was written, produced, and directed by Beaumont Smith. It is the sixth in his series about the rural family the Hayseeds and concerns their discovery of a lost tribe.

It is considered a lost film.

== Synopsis ==
Mum and Day Hayseed are visited by an archaeologist fresh from university, Owen Osborne, looking for signs of prehistoric people in nearby caves. They go through a cave and discover a secret valley which is home to a lost tribe, who have never been in contact with the outside world, wear skins for clothing, and are surrounded by diamonds.

Dad Hayseed makes friends with Wup who plays an ancient form of golf and Owen falls in love with the Wup daughter, the beautiful Golden Girl, rescuing her from an unwanted suitor, Beetle Brows. This leads to a rising of an opposing clan, and the Wups flee to civilisation with the Hayseeds.

They go to Sydney and have various adventures, including a trip to the Randwick Races. Olive is kidnapped by Beetle Brows but the Hayseeds and Owen save the day.

== Cast ==
- Hector St Clair as Wup
- Lotus Thompson as the Golden Girl
- Gordon Collingridge as Owen Osborne
- J.P. O'Neill as Dad Hayseed
- Kathleen Mack as Mrs Wup
- Roy Wilson as Beetle Brown
- Pinky Weatherley as Mum Hayseed
- Nina Dacre as Tessie Worth
- Dunstan Webb as Terry

== Production ==
Popular stage star Hector St Clair, who had arrived in Australia from England in 1921 and decided to stay, made his feature debut in the lead. The romantic leads from Townies and Hayseeds, Gordon Collingridge and Lotus Thompson, returned here, although playing different roles. Thompson soon left for Hollywood, where she acted in some films and achieved fame for deliberately disfiguring her legs.

It is likely that Beaumont Smith was inspired by the Buster Keaton movie, Three Ages (1923). The movie was shot in September October 1923 in Sydney and Port Hacking, with interiors at the Rushcutters Bay studio.

During production, actors turned up at Sydney's Central Railway Station in cavemen gear to film a sequence, causing a commotion.

Smith experienced a notable lack of co-operation from officials making this film, being barred from shooting at Randwick racecourse and Sydney Town Hall. Censors also requested removal of a title referring to a recent alleged bribe of £25,000 paid to Billy Hughes.

== Reception ==
=== Critical ===
When the film was released the Adelaide Mail called it "amusing... Hector St. Clair... is very funny. Lotus Thompson is delightful."

Everyones wrote "Beaumont Smith, even if he has not yet attained greatness in his efforts, is much to be commended for giving us a-sequence of very humorous periods in the life of the Hayseeds. Something unique in construction is to be found in the present offering... Considering the great difficulties in preserving the continuity in a city where there are a great many difficulties in the way, a number of amusing episodes are noted, and these are aided by the clever subtitling, nearly all good for laughs. The picture is overlong, if anything."

=== Box office ===
Although business was called "exceptionally fine" it appears to have not been a big hit and Smith ceased production of the series. However Smith revived it several years later with The Hayseeds (1933) to popular success.
