= Said Hanrahan =

1919 poem by Patrick Joseph Hartigan

- by John O'Brien
- Written: 1919
- First published in: The Catholic Press
- Country: Australia
- Language: English
- Publication date: July 1919

"Said Hanrahan" is a poem written by the Australian bush poet John O'Brien, the pen name of Roman Catholic priest Patrick Joseph Hartigan. The poem's earliest known publication was in July 1919 in The Catholic Press, appearing in 1921 in the anthology Around the Boree Log and Other Verses.

The poem describes the recurrent natural cycle of droughts, floods and bushfires in rural Australia as seen by "Hanrahan", a pessimistic man of Irish descent. "'We'll all be rooned', said Hanrahan"—an adage extracted from the poem—has entered the Australian English lexicon.

== Poem Description ==
The poem starts with the area in the grip of a drought, the worst since "the banks went bad"; a reference to the drought and banking crisis of the early 1890s.

"If we don't get three inches, man,

Or four to break this drought,

We'll all be rooned," said Hanrahan,

"Before the year is out."

In time, the rains "drummed a homely tune" on "iron roof and window-pane". The problem then changed from drought to flood. "Banker" refers to a watercourse filled from bank to bank, unusual in Australia where many watercourses are ephemeral or only intermittently full.

And every creek a banker ran,

And dams filled overtop;

"We'll all be rooned," said Hanrahan,

"If this rain doesn't stop."

"In God's good time" the rain stopped and spring arrived with "harvest-hopes immense". The "knee-deep" grass, while good for feeding livestock, brought to mind the risk of bushfire.

"There'll be bush-fires for sure, me man,

There will, without a doubt;

We'll all be rooned," said Hanrahan,

"Before the year is out."

== Popular culture ==
The key refrain in the poem is "We'll all be rooned" ("rooned" is a transcription of an Irish Australian pronunciation of "ruined") which has entered the Australian lexicon as a dismissive response to predictions of disasters or hard times, especially those out of the control of the speakers.

== The Poem ==
SAID HANRAHAN

"We'll all be rooned," said Hanrahan,
In accents most forlorn,
Outside the church, ere Mass began,
One frosty Sunday morn.

The congregation stood about,
Coat-collars to the ears,
And talked of stock, and crops, and drought,
As it had done for years.

"It's lookin' crook," said Daniel Croke;
"Bedad, it's cruke, me lad,
For never since the banks went broke
Has seasons been so bad."

"It's dry, all right," said young O'Neil,
With which astute remark
He squatted down upon his heel
And chewed a piece of bark.

And so around the chorus ran
"It's keepin' dry, no doubt."
"We'll all be rooned," said Hanrahan,
"Before the year is out.

"The crops are done; ye'll have your work
To save one bag of grain;
From here way out to Back-o'-Bourke
They're singin' out for rain.

"They're singin' out for rain," he said,
"And all the tanks are dry."
The congregation scratched its head,
And gazed around the sky.

"There won't be grass, in any case,
Enough to feed an ass;
There's not a blade on Casey's place
As I came down to Mass."

"If rain don't come this month," said Dan,
And cleared his throat to speak--
"We'll all be rooned," said Hanrahan,
"If rain don't come this week."

A heavy silence seemed to steal
On all at this remark;
And each man squatted on his heel,
And chewed a piece of bark.

"We want a inch of rain, we do,"
O'Neil observed at last;
But Croke "maintained" we wanted two
To put the danger past.

"If we don't get three inches, man,
Or four to break this drought,
We'll all be rooned," said Hanrahan,
"Before the year is out."

In God's good time down came the rain;
And all the afternoon
On iron roof and window-pane
It drummed a homely tune.

And through the night it pattered still,
And lightsome, gladsome elves
On dripping spout and window-sill
Kept talking to themselves.

It pelted, pelted all day long,
A-singing at its work,
Till every heart took up the song
Way out to Back-o'Bourke.

And every creek a banker ran,
And dams filled overtop;
"We'll all be rooned," said Hanrahan,
"If this rain doesn't stop."

And stop it did, in God's good time;
And spring came in to fold
A mantle o'er the hills sublime
Of green and pink and gold.

And days went by on dancing feet,
With harvest-hopes immense,
And laughing eyes beheld the wheat
Nid-nodding o'er the fence.

And, oh, the smiles on every face,
As happy lad and lass
Through grass knee-deep on Casey's place
Went riding down to Mass.

While round the church in clothes genteel
Discoursed the men of mark,
And each man squatted on his heel,
And chewed his piece of bark.

"There'll be bush-fires for sure, me man,
There will, without a doubt;
We'll all be rooned," said Hanrahan,
"Before the year is out."

John O'Brien
