= The Price (1924 film) =

1924 film

- Everyone's 12 November 1924
- Directed by: Dunstan Webb
- Written by: Mary Mallon
- Produced by: Mary Mallon
- Starring: James Alexander
- Production company: Australian National Films
- Release date: 18 October 1924
- Country: Australia
- Languages: Silent film English intertitles
- Budget: £1,000

The Price is a 1924 Australian silent film made with a largely amateur cast under the direction of Dunstan Webb. It is considered a lost film.

== Synopsis ==
Tom Howard's wealthy parents want him to become a banker but he leaves home to become a jockey. He does not do well and decides to return home, only to read that his mother and father have been killed in a motor accident.

Too ashamed to collect his inheritance, he buys an old horse and works as a cab driver in Sydney.

Tom is eventually found in a hospital by his sister who persuades him to return home, where he reconciles with his former girlfriend.

== Cast ==
- James Alexander as Tom Howard
- Muriel Copeland as sister
- Doris Brooks
- Belle Bates
- Eddie Hamilton (jockey)
- Bert Ralton and His Havana Band
- Jimmy McMahon
- Marigold as the racehorse

== Production ==
Mary Mallon formed her own company, Australian National Films, in April 1924 and spent less than £1,000 to make the movie.

Shooting began in early 1924. The movie featured several Sydney cabarets and racing stables, including Randwick Racecourse.

Part scenes at the Ambassador Hotel were shot in August 1924.

Some of the actors were amateurs cast from a competition. The A reported of the cast were amateurs, selected over a thousand applicants.

== Release ==
A preview of the film was held in October 1924. Everyones said the film "was most generally approved, the photography and direction being equal to anything done in this country."

Some screenings were accompanied by Dunstan Webb, who said he would talk to any members of the audience interested in appearing in future films made by the company.

A critic from Everyones called it "a creditable story, ably retold by an efficient producer and a clever company of actors, most of them screen tyros, but, under capable direction, doing exceptionally good work. Being locally-made, it will, as usual, be taken more critically than a majority of the overseas article." The critic did add "the tale is excellently told, and the many masterly touches of realism, so naturally transferred to the screen, are a credit to the producer. Unfortunately, the ending comes some- what abruptly, due, we are given to understand, by force of circumstances (mainly financial)."

The costs were so low the film reportedly made a small profit.

Mallon was involved in the making of another film, Repentant Woman. However filming ended when the production ran out of money and Mallon left for New Zealand with a copy of The Price.

Mallon later claimed two cast members of The Price, Phyllis du Barry and Lucille Lisle, found success in the USA.
