= The Last Chance (1937 film) =

1937 film directed by Thomas Bentley

- Directed by: Thomas Bentley
- Written by: Frank Stayton (play); Harry Hughes
- Produced by: Warwick Ward
- Starring: Frank Leighton; Judy Kelly; Laurence Hanray; Wyndham Goldie
- Cinematography: Ernest Palmer
- Edited by: James Corbett
- Music by: John Reynders
- Production company: Welwyn Studios
- Distributed by: Pathé Pictures International
- Release date: 11 November 1937
- Running time: 74 minutes
- Country: United Kingdom
- Language: English

The Last Chance is a 1937 British drama film directed by Thomas Bentley and starring Frank Leighton, Judy Kelly and Laurence Hanray. It was written by Harry Hughes based on the play by Frank Stayton. It was made as a quota quickie at British International Pictures' second studio at Welwyn. The film's sets were designed by the art director Duncan Sutherland. Its plot involves a gunrunner who makes a jail break in order to gather evidence to prove he is innocent of murder.

== Plot ==
Gun-runner Alan Burmister is wrongly convicted of murdering moneylender Ivor Connell and given a life sentence, despite a brilliant defence by his barrister and friend, John Worrall. Gratitude prompts Alan's fiancée, Mary, to marry John. Two years later, Alan escapes and seeks John and Mary's help. They agree to assist him. When fresh evidence clears Alan, John is exposed as the true killer, having murdered Connell over heavy debts. John commits suicide, leaving Alan and Mary free to reunite.

== Cast ==
- Frank Leighton as Alan Burmister
- Judy Kelly as Mary Perrin
- Laurence Hanray as Mr. Perrin
- Wyndham Goldie as John Worrall
- Franklyn Bellamy as Inspector Cutts
- Aubrey Mallalieu as Judge Croyle
- Billy Milton as Michael Worrall
- Jenny Laird as Betty
- Charles Sewell as Brough
- Alfred Wellesley as Ivor Connell

== Reception ==
The Monthly Film Bulletin wrote: "There is interest and suspense. The acting is not very experienced and make-up is conspicuous and poor."

Kine Weekly wrote: "Triangle crime melodrama of fantastic but arresting design. There are moments when some of the players are not quite equal to the histrionic demands, but taken as a whole the picture, guards its story secret well. The climax is showmanlike and the incidental detail tense and, when conditions demand, appropriately diverting."

Variety wrote: "Commendable quota picture. Interest languishes halfway, but picks up to a dramatic, interesting climax. ... Generally well acted."
