= The Face at the Window (play) =

1897 play by F. Brooke Warren

The Face at the Window is a melodramatic detective play written by F. Brooke Warren and first produced in 1897.

== Plot ==
Set in Paris, the play's villain is a serial killer named Le Loup, who precedes his killings with a loud wolf-howl. He is pursued by the master detective Paul Gouffet. In an iconic scene, Gouffet causes a dead victim to complete the act of writing his murderer's name by passing an electric current through the arm muscles.

== Adaptations ==
The 1897 play gave rise to a succession of film versions. The 1939 adaptation is the best known, but the list of adaptations includes:

- A 1919 Australian silent film directed by Charles Villiers.
- A 1920 British silent film directed by Wilfred Noy.
- A 1932 British film directed by Leslie S. Hiscott.
- A 1939 British film directed by George King.
