= Barry Butts In =

- Still from film
- Directed by: Beaumont Smith
- Written by: Beaumont Smith
- Produced by: Beaumont Smith
- Starring: Barry Lupino
- Production company: Beaumont Smith's Productions
- Release date: 9 August 1919
- Running time: 5 reels
- Country: Australia
- Language: Silent

Barry Butts In is a 1919 Australian film comedy from director Beaumont Smith starring British vaudevillian Barry Lupino, who was then visiting Australia. It is considered a lost film.

== Plot ==
Barry (Barry Lupino), works in a grocery store in the country. He falls in love with a beautiful young girl (Agnes Dobson) in a touring pantomime show who is the granddaughter of Barry's uncle, a wealthy man who years ago disowned the girl's mother because she married an actor. The old man requests his nephews come to Sydney so he can choose an heir. Barry's cousins try to humiliate him but he manages to triumph and inherit his uncle's fortune, and marry the girl.

== Cast ==
- Barry Lupino as Barry
- John Cosgrove
- Agnes Dobson

== Production ==
Barry Lupino was uncle of Ida Lupino and the film incorporated many of his routines.

Charles Villiers was assistant director.

== Release ==
When the film was released a competition was held for naming the movie. The gimmick helped the movie become a success at the box office.
