= Cows and Cuddles =

1921 film

- Directed by: Tal Ordell
- Starring: C Scott
- Release date: 1921
- Running time: two-reels
- Country: Australia
- Language: silent

Cow and Cuddles is a 1921 Australian short comedy film. It was the directorial debut of Tal Ordell who later made the classic The Kid Stakes. It experienced difficulties obtaining a release.
