= Dope (1924 film) =

1924 film

- Everyones 30 July 1924
- Directed by: Dunstan Webb
- Written by: Con Drew
- Starring: Gordon Collingridge; Lorraine Esmond; Charles Villiers
- Cinematography: Lacey Percival
- Production company: Australasian Picture Productions
- Distributed by: A. R. Shepherd
- Release date: 26 July 1924
- Country: Australia
- Languages: Silent film English intertitles

Dope is a 1924 Australian silent film about a respected citizen who is blackmailed by someone from his past. It is considered a lost film.

== Synopsis ==
Hugh Murnin, a pillar of Sydney society, has a secret past as a pearler on Thursday Island, during which time he believes he killed a man in a drunken brawl. He is blackmailed by one of his old drinking mates, Slick Harvey, who also tries to seduce Murnin's daughter, Mildred (Lorraine Esmond).

Mildred's fiancé, Tom (Gordon Collingridge) exposes Harvey as the leader of a gang of opium smugglers and that it was he, not Murnin, who killed the man on Thursday Island. Mildred and Tom get married.

== Cast ==
- Gordon Collingridge as Tom Searle
- Lorraine Esmond as Mildred Murnin
- Charles Villiers
- Monica Mack
- Robert Purdie
- Jack Raymond
- William Newman
- J.N. Tait

== Production ==
The script was written by Sydney journalist and author Con Drew, and was originally titled The Trail of the Twang. (This script was copyrighted in December 1922.)

The film was made by a Queensland company (see below) but shot in Sydney "because no facilities existed in Queensland for producing pictures. There was no studio in Queensland, and all the suitable artists for the company’s purposes were resident in Sydney." The mansion scenes were shot in a mansion owned by Lebbeus Hordern.

Shooting took place in April 1923, in part at Rushcutter's Bay and was completed by May but the film was not released until the following year. The Bulletin commented "if the pitcher is up to the standard of Drew’s racing yarns it will do."

== Reception ==
The film received poor reviews and unenthusiastic public reception. The Sydney Truth did refer to a "recordbreaking run at the Lyric Wintergarden".

The film appeared at the Lyric on a bill with a stage show involving jui jitsu set at an opium den.

The Bulletin said "The story is little better than a sensational front-page scoop in a yellow newspaper and there is a lot wanting on the technical side."

== Australasian Picture Productions Scandal ==
Dope was the only film from Australasian Picture Productions, which is not to be confused with Australasian Films. The company was registered on 1 February 1923 in Queensland by promoters Stephen Perry and Percy McMahon with a capital of £25,000. McMahon later said:

It was always my desire and intention to produce in Australia moving picture plays of a high moral character and in such pictures to propagate Roman Catholic sentiments. Such w'as the chief feature of the appeals made by me to the Roman Catholic clergy when canvassing them to subscribe for shares in the company, and the company’s shareholders consist almost entirely of Roman Catholic clergy.

Under the terms of the corporation, Perry and McMahon were to receive £1,000 in part payment for their services, plus £1,560 annually for seven years and 6,000 fully paid-up shares.

By 30 June 1924 the company's profit and loss statement showed director's salaries of £1,705, office salaries of £154 and general expenses of £230. In December of the year the company went into liquidation owing £2,974.

The petition to wind up the company was made by James Duhig, the Roman Catholic Archbishop of Brisbane.

"The investigations satisfy me, that the company was a swindle", said Justice McNaughten in the Supreme Court of New South Wales. "An investigation is necessary...There was a gross fraud on the part of one of the promoters. All they did was to produce one abortive film. There is no doubt that this is a case for the most searching investigation."

Litigation concerning the company was still going on in 1928.
