= Alf Lawrence =

English-Australian musical composer

- Born: 1879 or 1880; England
- Died: January 1955 (aged 75) England

Alf Lawrence or Alfred J. Lawrence (died 1955) was an English-Australian musical composer who worked extensively in vaudeville, pantomime, revusical, revue and follies, radio and film.

Lawrence was born in England and moved to Australia in 1914. He was heavily involved in radio. He toured New Zealand in 1928.

A 1939 article said "Half the songs you hear over the air have been written by him." He worked at the ABC for fourteen years under contract.

Lawrence returned to London in 1953 and died two years later, aged 75.

== Select credits ==
=== Radio musicals ===
- The Weather Box (1938)

=== Films ===
- The Hayseeds (1933)
- Splendid Fellows (1934)
- The Flying Doctor (1936)
- Rangle River (1936)
