= Hector St Clair =

English comedian

Hector St. Clair
- Born: Hector Alfred Tompkins; 11 May; Southampton, Hampshire, England, United Kingdom
- Died: December 1932; Melbourne, Victoria, Australia
- Occupation(s): Actor, comedian, musician

Hector Alfred Tompins (21 May? - December 1932) professionally known as Hector St. Clair, was an English comedian and musician who came to Australia with the J.C Williamson Theatre company in 1921 and stayed there for the rest of his career, he was also a talented violinist He appeared in the film Prehistoric Hayseeds (1923). He also performed at the Prince Edward Theatre in Sydney, Australia on June 24, 1927. St. Clair had his own troupe called "The Ambassadors" and was known for his catchphrase "Isn't it awful", he appeared in both variety and musical comedy and also featured on radio. other than Williamson's he also toured with company's of Benjamin Fuller, the Tivoli circuit, George Marlow and Connors and Paul amongst numerous others, he died of lung cancer in December 1932.
