= Agnes Dobson =

Australian actress (1904–1987)

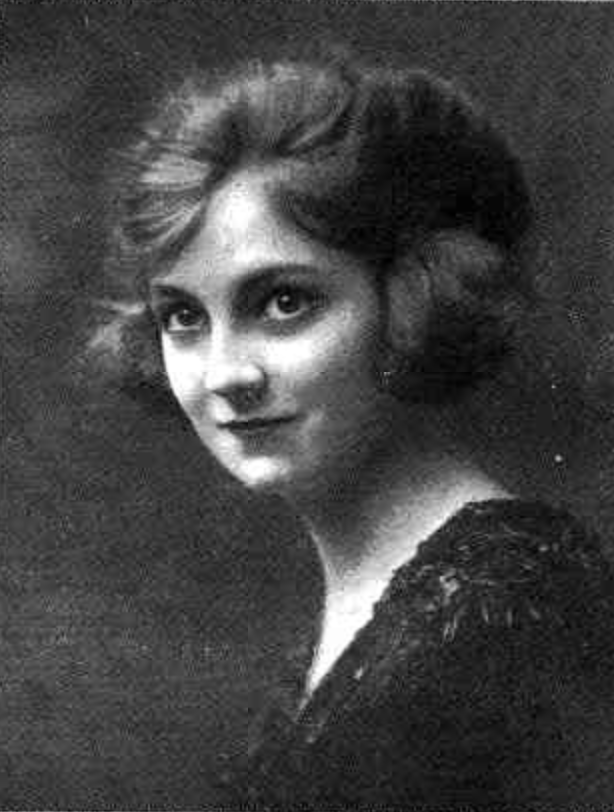
- Agnes Dobson, 1922
- Born: 30 December 1904; Glebe Point, New South Wales, Australia
- Died: 26 February 1987 (aged 82); Oakleigh, Victoria, Australia
- Other name: Agnes Grey
- Citizenship: Australia

Agnes May Dobson (30 December 1904 – 26 February 1987) was an Australian actress.

== Career ==
Agnes Dobson was born on 30 December 1904, at Glebe Point, in Sydney, Australia, though her birth was not registered. Dobson's parents were New Zealand-born actor and theatre manager Collet Barker Dobson, and actor Harriet Agnes Thornton (née Meddings) who performed under her stage name Harrie Collet. Agnes Dobson's first stage performance was as a baby in a cradle for a production by her father's theatre company.

Dobson began her career-proper aged 7 in Little Lord Fauntleroy, another of her father's productions, before she was sent to school and left the stage again until her teenage years.

She appeared in one of Australia's first silent films, 1919's The Face at the Window, and found success playing a damsel in distress in 1919 comedy film Barry Butts In. During production of that film, a member of the public thought Dobson's kidnapping was real and attempted to save her and interrupted the filming.

Dobson also wrote plays, and in 1936 her work Dark Brother tied for second prize in the Adelaide Advertiser's Centenary playwright competition.

She opened her own stagecraft studio in 1935, and ran the Crawford School of Broadcasting when it was founded in 1952 with fellow actor Moira Carlton.

In the late 1950s and 1960s Dobson appeared as Mrs Sharpshott on ABC Melbourne's radio serial The Village Glee Club.

Dobson wrote an autobiography, An Australian Speaks of Many Things, but it was never published. Chapters are held by the National Film and Sound Archive.

The papers of Agnes Dobson are held by the National Library of Australia.

== Personal life ==
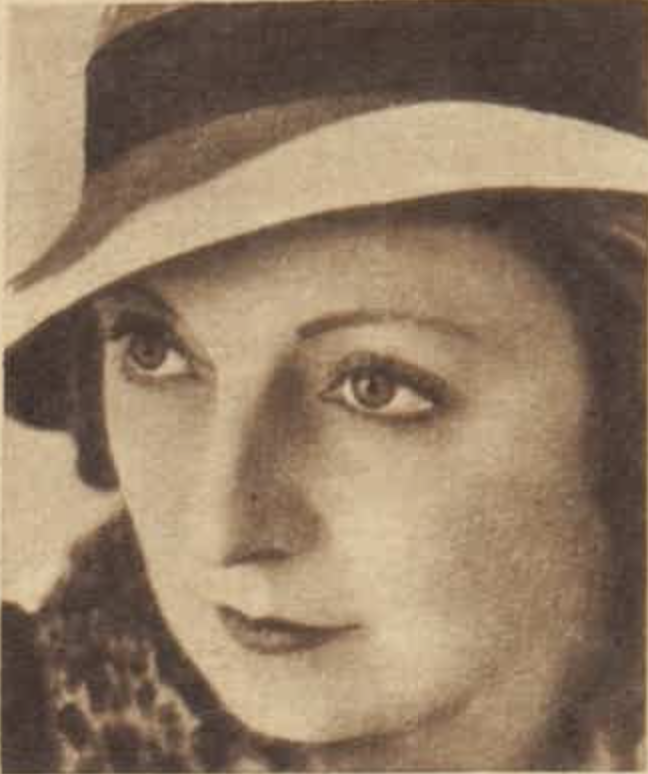
Dobson in 1937

Dobson married actor and playwright Frederick Stanley Holah (also known as Ronald Riley) in 1921 when she was 19. They had a son William John also known as Bill Barclay (1921-1970).

The marriage ended in divorce, and Dobson remarried in 1924 to salesman George Oliver Clapcott Barclay. They were divorced in 1931.

Dobson remarried in 1932 to Wilfred Thornton, a business manager, but the marriage was dissolved in 1934.

In her later years, Dobson lived in a nursing home in Oakleigh, Victoria, with support from the Actors' Benevolent Fund.

She died in the nursing home on 26 February 1987.

== Select filmography ==
- The Hayseeds' Back-blocks Show (1917)
- Barry Butts In (1919)
- The Face at the Window (1919)
- Dark Brown (1957)
- As You Are (1958)
- Ruth (1959)
- Eye of the Night (1960)
- Waters of the Moon (1961)
- Quiet Night (1961)
- She'll Be Right (1962)
- Macbeth (1965)
