= John O'Brien (poet) =

Australian priest, educator, author and poet (1878–1952)

Cover of 1968 edition of Hartigan's Around The Boree Log anthology first published 1921

Monsignor Patrick Joseph Hartigan (13 October 1878 – 27 December 1952) was an Australian Roman Catholic priest, educator, author and poet, writing under the name John O'Brien.

== Life ==
Born at Yass, New South Wales Patrick Joseph Hartigan studied at St Patrick's Seminary, Manly and St Patrick's College, Goulburn.

His poetry was very popular in Australia and was well received in Ireland and the United States.

Hartigan died in Lewisham, an inner suburb of Sydney, in 1952.

== Works ==
Hartigan wrote under the pseudonym "John O'Brien." His verse celebrated the lives and mores of the outback pastoral folk he ministered to as a peripatetic curate in the southern New South Wales and Riverina towns of Thurgoona, Berrigan and Narrandera, in the first two decades of the 20th century.

The refrain We'll all be rooned from his poem Said Hanrahan has entered colloquial Australian English as a jocular response to any prediction of dire consequences arising, particularly, from events outside the interlocutor's control.

He also wrote a number of articles on early Irish priests in Australia, later collected in The Men of '38 and Other Pioneer Priests.

== Legacy ==
His most popular book of poetry was filmed in 1925 as Around the Boree Log.

A John O'Brien Festival was held annually in Narrandera. The John O'Brien Heritage Museum is located in Audley Street.

== Bibliography ==
=== Poetry collections ===
- Around the Boree Log and Other Verses (1921)
- The Parish of St Mel's and Other Verses (1958)

==== Selected list of poems ====
Title	Year	First published	Reprinted/collected in
"Said Hanrahan"	1919	The Catholic Press, 31 July 1919, p19	Around the Boree Log and Other Verses, Angus and Robertson, 1921, pp. 77-81
