= Frank Leighton =

Australian actor (1908–1962)

Frank Leighton (1908–1962) was an Australian actor best known for two leading roles in films for Ken G. Hall, Thoroughbred (1936) and Tall Timbers (1937).

== Biography ==
Leighton was born in Sydney and studied at St John's School, Darlinghurst, before winning a scholarship to Cleveland Boys High School. He was working for his father when he heard the theatrical firm J.C. Williamson Ltd were conducting voice trials at Her Majesty's Theatre. He auditioned and three months later was employed by the company in a production of The Lady of the Rose. He worked for Williamsons over the next 13 years, acting in dramas, comedies and musicals, including productions of Blue Roses, Hold My Hand, Our Miss Gibbs, The Quaker Girl, The Merry Widow and The Maid of the Mountains opposite Gladys Moncrieff. He understudied for visiting star William Feversham in a production of The Prince and the Pauper.

Leighton also acted in movies, starting with Two Minutes Silence (1933). His most notable credits were leading roles in Thoroughbred (1936) and Tall Timbers (1937) for Cinesound Productions. He sang briefly in Tall Timbers where he was called "a solid hero". His co-star in Thoroughbred was Helen Twelvetrees with whom Ken G. Hall claims Leighton had an affair during filming.

=== Later career ===
Leighton moved to London in 1937, where he mostly worked in theatre.

He declared bankruptcy in 1950.

Leighton died in 1962 of a brain hemorrhage. He was on board the ship Canberra while returning to Australia from Britain. He was 56 years old and left behind a widow and six-year-old daughter.

== Filmography ==
Year	Title	Role	Notes
1933	Two Minutes Silence		
1934	Operator 13	Union Major	Uncredited
1934	Hide-Out	New Paree Cabaret Headwaiter	Uncredited
1934	Splendid Fellows	The Hon. Hurbert Montmorency	
1936	Thoroughbred	Tommy Dawson	
1937	Tall Timbers	Jim Thornton	
1937	The Last Chance	Alan Burmister	
1938	I See Ice	Ice Rink Manager	Uncredited
1938	It's in the Air	Pvt. Bob Bullock	
1957	The Shiralee	Fred, the Barman	

=== TV ===
- Five Bells for Logan (1961)
- Reunion Day (1962)

=== Theatre ===
- The Lady of the Rose
- Blue Roses
- Hold My Hand
- Our Miss Gibbs
- Mr Cinders
- The Quaker Girl
- The Merry Widow
- Till, Darling
- The Prince and the Pauper
- My Lady's Dress
- Blue Mountain Melody (1934)
- The Fleet's Lit Up (1939)
- Dish Ran Away (1950) – Whitehall
