= Catherine Howard (disambiguation) =

Catherine Howard (c. 1523–1542) was queen consort of Henry VIII of England.

Catherine Howard or Katherine Howard may also refer to:

- Catherine Howard, Duchess of Norfolk (d. 1452), daughter of William Moleyns and wife of John Howard, 1st Duke of Norfolk
- Catherine Howard, Baroness Berners (fl. 1450), wife of John Bourchier, 2nd Baron Berners
- Catherine Howard, Baroness Abergavenny (d. after 1478), second wife of Edward Neville, 3rd Baron Bergavenny
- Catherine Howard (1518–1530), daughter of Thomas Howard, 3rd Duke of Norfolk and Elizabeth Howard, Duchess of Norfolk
- Catherine Howard (d. 1548), daughter of Thomas Howard, 2nd Duke of Norfolk, wife of Rhys ap Gruffydd and Henry Daubeney, 1st Earl of Bridgewater
- Catherine Howard (d. 1596), daughter of Henry Howard, Earl of Surrey and wife of Henry Berkeley, 7th Baron Berkeley
- Catherine Howard, Countess of Nottingham (c.1550–1603), née Carey, confidant of Elizabeth I
- Catherine Howard, Countess of Suffolk (1564–1638), née Knyvett, lady-in-waiting to Anne of Denmark
- Catherine Cecil, Countess of Salisbury (c.1590-1673), née Howard, wife of William Cecil, 2nd Earl of Salisbury
- Catherine Howard, Duchess of Norfolk, née Brockholes, wife of Charles Howard, 10th Duke of Norfolk (1720–1786)
- Catherine Howard (d. 1874), daughter of Henry Howard and wife of Philip Stourton
- Katherine G. Howard (1898–1986), American politician
- Catherine Howard (soccer), American soccer player for the West Michigan Firewomen

== See also ==
- Kate Howard, fictional character from General Hospital
- Katie Howard (disambiguation)
