= She'll Be Right =

1962 Australian television play

- Advertisement from The Age 25 July 1960
- Written by: George F. Kerr
- Directed by: Christopher Muir
- Country of origin: Australia
- Original language: English

Production
- Running time: 60 mins
- Production company: ABC

Original release
- Network: ABC
- Release: 25 July 1962 (Melbourne)
- Release: 8 August 1962 (Sydney)

She'll Be Right is a 1962 Australian television play which aired on the ABC.

== Plot ==
In 1962, a group of tourists meet an Englishman, Gutherie, at a French mountain inn. Guthrie tells them about an Australian soldier, Nugget Wilson, a prisoner of war in Germany during World War Two. Wilson escaped and joined the French Resistance movement along with Guthrie. Wilson is captured and executed by a German firing squad. His last words are "she'll be right".

== Cast ==
- Fred Parslow as Guthrie
- Kevin Hanily as Nugget Wilson
- Alan Hopgood as Hank
- Syd Conabere as Bluey
- Julie Allen
- Horst Bergfried
- Agnes Dobson as Mrs. Wilson
- Mary Duchesne as French resistance member
- Mary Reynolds as Lisbeth
- John Royle as German civilian
- Stuart Finch
- Andrew Lodge
- Donald Sey

== Production ==
The drama was shot in Melbourne. It was the first straight dramatic role for dancer Mary Muchesne and ABV-2 announcer John Royle. "I am very pleased to be getting the part," said Royle. "It will give me an insight into the inside. In the past I have always been on the outside looking in."

The story also served as a radio play which was selected as the A.B.C.'s radio play for the 1961 Italia Prize and had been broadcast in Australia in 1961. It had been repeated in February 1962.

== Reception ==
The Sydney Morning Herald felt producer Chris Muir "adopting the immensely impressive pace of a professional, raised a living and passionate memorial to the memory of Australian soldiers" and felt the performance of Kevin Hanily ("completely credible and sympathetic") and the supporting cast "and the mode of presentation generally, bore the austere stark simplicity of a medieval passion play, and with much the same hushed effect."

Valda Marshall from the same paper called it "a first rate drama... a beautiful piece of craftmanship, with a casting that was almost faultless...Kerr's theme, that war and heroes are made up in the main from ordinary nondescript people, was one that could easily have become just that . . . ordinary and nondescript. But instead he produced a quiet, tight little drama that ranks as one of the best Australian plays the A.B.C. has given us."

Frank Roberts from The Bulletin said writer Kerr "has taken one of the everyday phrases Australians use, like, and quit unintentionally he has written one of the jolliest spoof around it, guying incoherent Englishmen, casual Australians, international tourists, and the French Maquis. Produced, again unintentionally, as a farce by Christopher Muir, it proved one of the better television comedies of the year."

== See also ==
- List of live television plays broadcast on ABC (1956–1969)
