= Queen of the Turf =

Queen of the Turf may refer to:

- The Queen of the Turf Stakes, a Group 1 Australian Thoroughbred horse race for fillies and mares aged three years old and upwards
- Queen of the Turf, the American title for Silks and Saddles, a 1921 Australian / American film directed by John K. Wells
