= While the Billy Boils (film) =

1921 film

- Original poster advertising the film
- Directed by: Beaumont Smith
- Written by: Beaumont Smith
- Based on: the stories of Henry Lawson adapted for the stage by Beaumont Smith
- Produced by: Beaumont Smith
- Starring: Tal Ordell
- Production company: Beaumont Smith's Productions
- Distributed by: Beaumont Smith; Union Theatres
- Release date: 17 September 1921
- Running time: 5,800 feet
- Country: Australia
- Language: silent

While the Billy Boils is a 1921 Australian film from director Beaumont Smith based on Smith's stage play adaptation of several stories from Henry Lawson.

It is considered a lost film.

== Plot ==
Bob Brothers (Tal Ordell) is a bushman who quarrelled with his father ten years earlier, left him and changed his name. He returns to his father's station and takes a job there, eventually becoming the union representative of the station hands. His younger brother Dick (Robert MacKinnon) is being blackmailed by the evil Tessie (Lorna Lantaur) into stealing money. Bob takes the blame to protect his brother.

Dick and Bob both fall in love with Ruth. Bob tries to forget her by going out back and almost dies in the desert, but is rescued by an Afghan camel driver. He returns home and is blamed for another robbery, but is cleared of the charges and is united with Ruth.

== Cast ==
- Tal Ordell as Bob Brothers
- John Cosgrove as One-eyed Bogan
- Robert MacKinnon as Dick ebb
- Ernest T. Hearne as Steelman
- Gilbert Emery as Smithy
- J. P. O'Neill as Tom Mitchell
- Charles Beetham as Tom Wall
- Alf Scarlett as bank manager
- Elsie McCormick as Ruth
- Lorna Lantaur as Tessie Brand
- Rita Aslin as Mrs Stiffner
- May Renne as Mrs Brighten
- James Ward as Old Tallyho
- Charles Villers as Andy Regan
- Henry Lawson as himself

== 1916 Play Version ==
Beaumont Smith had previously adapted Lawson's for the stage in 1916, and it toured Australia for that and the following year.

The play was popular.

Members of the cast for the play appeared in Smith's debut feature, Our Friends, the Hayseeds (1917).

== Film Production ==
Smith shot and edited the film from July to August 1921 in and around Windsor and Redclay in New South Wales. His assistant director was Phil K. Walsh, who later directed two Australian films, Around the Boree Log and The Birth of White Australia. Lawson himself appears in a brief prologue.

Lawson had given all copyright in his work to Angus & Robertson, but its principal, George Robertson, agreed the money for the rights to the movie should go to Lawson, which became the author's main source of income in the last years of his life.

== Reception ==
Commercial results were strong.
