= Around the Boree Log =

1925 film

- Directed by: Phil K. Walsh
- Written by: Phil K. Walsh
- Based on: poems of Patrick Joseph Hartigan
- Starring: Molly O'Donohue
- Cinematography: Lacey Percival
- Production company: Phil K. Walsh Productions
- Release date: 25 September 1925
- Running time: 7,100 feet
- Country: Australia
- Languages: Silent film English intertitles

Around the Boree Log is a 1925 Australian silent film by Phil K. Walsh adapted from the poems of "John O'Brien" (Patrick Joseph Hartigan). It tells stories of a priest's life around the 1870s in the Goulburn area.

Unlike many Australian silent films, a copy of it survives today.

== Plot ==
A priest reads from the book of poems by John O'Brien and recalls his earlier life in the country. He remembers travelling hawkers, his first school, a bishop inspection, childhood romance, and the marriage of a girl to another man.

== Cast ==
- Molly O'Donohue (or O'Donohoe) as Laughing Mary

== Production ==
The movie was shot on location in the New South Wales bush, mostly at the Wollondilly River area near Goulburn, in early 1925. The director had previously worked as an assistant on While the Billy Boils (1921) and would direct The Birth of White Australia (1928). He also tried to make a film of the novel Love Blind but was unable to raise finance.

Most of the cast were anonymous people who lived in the area. Unlike The Birth of White Australia, which was funded by the residents of Young, this film received no financial assistance from Goulburn.

== Release ==
The film met with resistance from distributors who felt it was Roman Catholic propaganda. It was also criticised for having little plot and consisting mostly of a travelogue of scenery and incidents in the country.

Other reviewers however gave it unqualified praise; it screened throughout Australia and New Zealand, made money for its backers, and created renewed interest for Hartigan's book.

Box office success appears to have been strong.
