= The Digger Earl =

1924 film

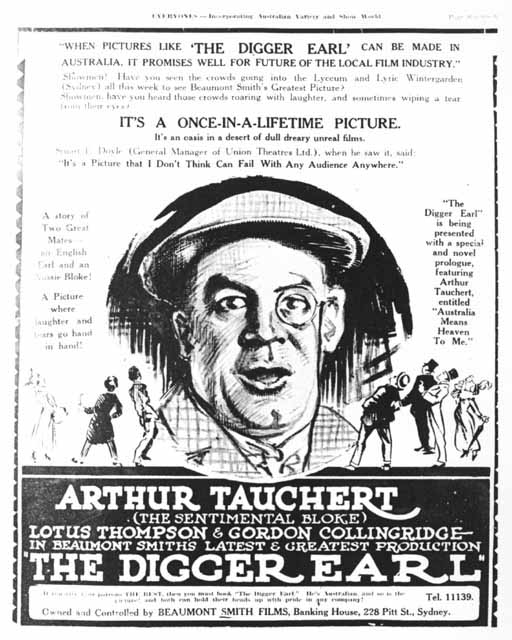
- Original poster
- Directed by: Beaumont Smith
- Written by: Beaumont Smith
- Produced by: Beaumont Smith
- Starring: Arthur Tauchert
- Cinematography: Lacey Percival
- Production company: Beaumont Smith's Productions
- Distributed by: Union Theatres
- Release date: 12 April 1924
- Country: Australia
- Language: silent

The Digger Earl is a 1924 Australian film comedy from director Beaumont Smith. The plot is about a typical Australian (Arthur Tauchert) who takes the place of an earl.

Only eight minutes of the film survives today.

== Plot ==
Bill Jones is an Aussie who leaves to serve in World War I in 1917, promising to return to his girlfriend Winnie. In France he rescues two of his friends after a disastrous attack. His mates want brandy and Bill tries to get some from an officer's tent; he is captured and sent to headquarters.

After the war Bill is penniless in London. He joins the crew of a boat bound for Australia and meets the likeable Earl of Margate.

The publicity-shy Earl is not happy to discover that Sydney newspapers have made his visit to Australia widely known. He persuades Bill to take his place, with the Earl acting as his valet.

When the boat arrives in Sydney, Bill struggles to impersonate a member of the British aristocracy and encounters difficulties from Captain Halliday. Bill is eventually reunited with Winnie.

== Cast ==
- Arthur Tauchert as Bill Jones
- Gordon Collingridge as the Earl of Margate
- Lotus Thompson as Betty Roberts
- Heather Jones as Winnie
- Don Gilham as the Dunchess of Margate
- Dunstan Webb as Captain Halliday
- Robert Purdie as Mr Halliday
- Reg Wykeham as Brigadier General
- J. P. O'Neill

== Production ==
Several of the cast had appeared in films from Smith before. Heather Jones made her film debut.

Shooting began in January 1924 at the Rushcutters Bay studio and on location around Sydney, including in the Domain, near Mrs. Macquarie's Chair, on the Osterley, at Surry Hills, and at Victoria Park racecourse. Scenes of trench warfare were shot at the military training camp at Liverpool. Newsreel footage was used for re-creation of wartime Australia.

Arthur Tauchert injured his eye during a fight sequence, requiring stitches. He also received good natured ribbing from members of the public while filming in Surry Hills, according to one report:

The monocle worn by Mr. Tauchert might have been treated with a fair amount of respect in some quarters, but not when scenes for the picture were being made round Surry Hills. If the actor managed to keep it in position the crowd commented on his appearance. If it fell out, despite his contortions, somebody was bound to roar 'Get some glue!'.

== Release ==
Screenings of the film were often accompanied with a personal appearance by Arthur Tauchert and a song composed by Emmanuel Aarons with lyrics by Beaumont Smith, "Australia Means Heaven to Me". The Adelaide Herald called it an "interesting and humorous story".
