= The Face at the Window (1919 film) =

- Directed by: Charles Villiers
- Written by: Gertrude Lockwood
- Based on: play by F. Brooke Warren
- Produced by: David B. O'Connor
- Starring: David B. O'Connor
- Cinematography: Lacey Percival
- Production company: D.B. O'Connor Feature Films
- Release date: 8 November 1919
- Running time: 5 reels
- Country: Australia
- Languages: Silent film; English intertitles

The Face at the Window is a 1919 Australian silent film about a master criminal and serial killer sought by the police. It was based on the popular 1897 play that opened to positive reviews and remained a stage hit for three decades. The play's success led to its being adapted several times as a film, this Australian production being the first. It was later remade three times in England: a 1920 film directed by Wilfred Noy, a 1932 film directed by Leslie S. Hiscott and the 1939 Tod Slaughter production, which is considered the best.

The producer O'Connor played the villain in the film, and the director Villiers also played a major role. The film is today considered lost, and very obscure.

== Plot ==
In Paris, a thief and murderer known as "Le Loup" (actually Lucio Delgrade) hides his identity behind a mask and howls before he kills his victims. He has killed 36 people in all. He kills a caretaker while rifling a safe. Then he stabs a banker, M. de Brison, whose daughter Marie has spurned his advances. Detective Paul Gouffet investigates, and Le Loup kills him. However, the detective is temporarily revived from the dead through a scientific device invented by a mad doctor and his reanimated hand is just able to write the name of Le Loup's real identity. The police go after Le Loup and the arch fiend is shot while trying to escape.

== Cast ==
- D.B. O'Connor as Lucio Delgrade
- Agnes Dobson as Marie de Brison
- Claude Turton as Paul Gouffet
- Gerald Harcourt as Lucien Cortier
- Collet Dobson as M. de Brison
- Charles Villiers as Barbelon
- Percy Walshe as Dr Le Blanc
- Lulu Vincent as Mother Pinau
- Syd Everett as Barlet
- Millie Carlton as maid
- Charles Beetham as Prefect of Police
- D.L. Dalziel was Detective Drummond
- Gilbert Emery as caretaker of bank

== Production ==
The movie was one of several based on the popular 1897 stage play. It was shot in the Rushcutters Bay study in March and April 1918. Censors requested the deletion of a scene where a policeman is stabbed by Le Loup.

It was the film debut of popular stage actor Agnes Dobson. She later reprised the role on stage.

== Reception ==
The film was a popular success and was widely seen, but today is regarded as lost.

Variety called it "the rankest kind of melodrama... might do as burlesque."
