= The Gentleman Bushranger =

1921 film

- Directed by: Beaumont Smith
- Written by: Beaumont Smith
- Based on: 'A Stripe for Trooper Casey' by Roderic Quinn
- Produced by: Beaumont Smith
- Starring: Dot McConville
- Production company: Beaumont Smith's Productions
- Distributed by: Beaumont Smith; Cecil Marks
- Release dates: 26 December 1921 (Australia); 3 February 1922 (NZ)
- Running time: 6,000 feet
- Country: Australia
- Languages: Silent; English intertitles

The Gentleman Bushranger is a 1921 Australian film melodrama from director Beaumont Smith. Bushranging films were banned at the time but Smith got around this by making the plot about a man falsely accused of being a bushranger.

== Plot ==
In 1857, an Englishman, Richard Lavender (Ernest Hearne), is travelling to Australia on a ship where he meets the beautiful Kitty Aronson. He is falsely accused by Peter Dargin (Tal Ordell) of murdering the ship's captain and is arrested. With the escape of an aboriginal friend, he escapes into the bush where he becomes a gold prospector. He meets Kitty, who runs a nearby selection, and they happily mine gold together until Dargin arrives and frames him for bushranger crimes. However Lavender ultimately proves his innocence.

Comic relief is provided by Ah Wom Bat (John Cosgrove), a Chinese cook, and a touring theatrical company that presents a version of East Lynne in a country town.

== Cast ==
- Dot McConville as Kitty Anson
- Ernest T Hearne as Richard Lavender
- Tal Ordell as Peter Dargin
- John Cosgrove as Ah Wom Bat
- Nada Conrade
- Monica Mack
- J.P. O'Neill
- Robert MacKinnon
- Fred Phillips
- Henry Lawson as himself

== Production ==
Female star Dot McConville was advertised as "the Commonwealth's premier horsewoman".

The segment showing the troupe performing East Lynne was likely taken from a short films directed by John Cosgrove, An East Lynne Fiasco (1917).

The movie was shot in four weeks in October 1921. Two and a half weeks were spent on location in Bowral and Berrima, with interiors shot in Sydney at the Rushcutters Bay Studio.

== Reception ==
- The Bulletin said the film "has some wonderfully beautiful scenic bits, but the story is a painful libel on 'A Stripe for Trooper Casey,' which it professes to follow, and is beneath criticism. So is the producing, and a great deal of the acting."
- The Sydney Sun had no problem with the adaptation of Quinn's novel, but was distressed by anachronistic hairstyles and costumes, and found much of the acting uninspired.
