= The Grey Glove =

1928 film

- Directed by: Dunstan Webb
- Written by: Gayne Dexter (title); E. V. Timms (story)
- Based on: newspaper serial by E. V. Timms
- Edited by: Mona Donaldson
- Production company: Australasian Films
- Distributed by: J.C. Williamson Films
- Release date: 9 July 1928
- Running time: 5,000 feet
- Country: Australia
- Languages: Silent film English intertitles

The Grey Glove is a 1928 Australian silent film based on a newspaper serial by E. V. Timms.

== Synopsis ==
An amateur detective, John Courtney, tries to catch a mysterious criminal who always leaves a grey glove behind. He tries to protect the mysterious Pauline Hemingway.

His fiancee Margaret becomes jealous and sets off to follow him dressed as a boy.

== Cast ==
- Aubrey Kelner as John Courtney
- Val Lassau as Margaret Trent
- Phyllis Wheldon as Pauline Hemingway
- Charles O'Mara as Inspector Drew
- William Thornton as Charlie James
- Claude Turton as Simpson
- George Ames as Peterson
- Carl Francis as Seton Carr
- James Alexander as Perry

== Production ==
The film was shot at Australasian's Bondi studios. It appears to have been shot prior to August 1926.

The film was the first screen appearance of Val Lassau who had been in the chorus of Rose Marie.

It seems there was some extra filming after Christmas 1926.

== Reception ==
The Australasian called it "an intriguing tale, in which action and mystery arc pleasantly mingled. Fortunately Mr. Webb has aimed at a mark that is not beyond tbc reach of a producer who has not the elaborate equipment of a costly studio at his disposal, and he has achieved his aim. The acting by a large cast is aa least as good as that in any Australian film."
