= Dunstan Webb =

Australian actor and director

Dunstan Webb was an Australian actor and director, who was a particular favourite of Australasian Films.

== Filmography ==
- In the Last Stride (1916) – actor
- The Breaking of the Drought (1920) – actor
- The Man from Snowy River (1920) – actor
- The Betrayer (1921) – actor
- When the Kellys Were Out (1923) – actor
- Prehistoric Hayseeds (1923) – actor
- The Digger Earl (1924) – actor
- Dope (1924) – director
- Joe (1924) – actor
- The Price (1924) – director
- Sunrise (1926) – actor
- Tall Timber (1926) – writer, director
- For the Term of His Natural Life (1927) – actor
- The Grey Glove (1928) – director
