= Rushcutters Bay Studio =

Australian film studio

Rushcutters Bay Studio was an Australian film studio built by Cosens Spencer in 1912 at Rushcutters Bay, Sydney.

For a number of years it was the leading film studio in Sydney, being the base of operations for Australasian Films. In 1925 that company built a new studio.

In 1933 Cinesound Productions converted the studios into a backup for their main studios at Bondi Beach.

== Selected Films Shot at Studio ==
- Know Thy Child (1921)
- Prehistoric Hayseeds (1923)
- The Digger Earl (1924)
- Splendid Fellows (1934)
