= The Face at the Window (1932 film) =

1932 film

- Raymond Massey and Claude Hulbert in the film
- Directed by: Leslie S. Hiscott
- Written by: H. Fowler Mear
- Based on: the play The Face at the Window by F. Brooke Warren
- Produced by: Julius Hagen
- Starring: Raymond Massey; Claude Hulbert; Isla Bevan
- Cinematography: Sydney Blythe
- Production company: Real Art Productions
- Distributed by: RKO Radio Pictures
- Release date: 18 October 1932
- Running time: 52 minutes
- Country: United Kingdom
- Language: English

The Face at the Window is a 1932 British drama film directed by Leslie S. Hiscott and starring Raymond Massey, Claude Hulbert and Isla Bevan. It was written by H. Fowler Mear based on the 1897 play of the same name by F. Brooke Warren and was made at Twickenham Studios as a quota quickie.

== Preservation status ==
The British Film Institute National Archive holds a collection of stills but no film or video materials.

== Story ==
Opening in the shadowed half-light of a bank vault in Paris, where a watchman has been mysteriously murdered, the picture centres around the methods of detective Paul Le Gros to solve the identity of a masked criminal called "Le Loup" (The Wolf), who kills with an injection of poison with a finger ring. Peter Pomeroy, the detective's useless assistant, provides a spot of comedy.

== Cast ==
- Raymond Massey as Paul le Gros
- Isla Bevan as Marie de Brisson
- Claude Hulbert as Peter Pomeroy
- Eric Maturin as Count Fournal
- Henry Mollison as Lucien Courtier
- A. Bromley Davenport as Gaston de Brisson
- Harold Meade as Dr. Renard
- Dennis Wyndham as Lafonde
- Charles Groves as Jacques

== Reception ==
Film Weekly wrote: "Stereotyped detective stuff in which suspicion is carefully cast on everybody before alighting on the right person. Fair entertainment."

Kine Weekly wrote: "The well-known old melodrama does not wear too well, and for these sophisticated days strikes rather too ingenuous a note. ... Raymond Massey is the most natural actor in the cast, and makes the most of the part of Paul. ... Played in broad melodramatic vein with equally broad comedy relief in the presentation of the character of Peter, the picture fails to register a real thrill or really to interest one very deeply."
