= The Face at the Window (1920 film) =

1920 film

The Face at the Window is a 1920 British silent crime film directed by Wilfred Noy and starring C. Aubrey Smith, Gladys Jennings and Jack Hobbs It is based on a play of the same name by Brooke Warren first performed in 1897. Its plot concerns a British criminologist who helps the French police to solve a murder in Paris.

== Cast ==
- C. Aubrey Smith - Bentinck
- Gladys Jennings - Marie de Brisson
- Jack Hobbs - Lucien Cartwright
- Charles Quatermaine - Lucien deGradoff
- Ben Field - Peter Pottlebury
- Simeon Stuart - Henri de Brisson
- Kathleen Vaughan - Babbette
- Kinsey Peile - Doctor le blanc
