= Kate Howarde =

- Born: Catherine Clarissa Howarde; 28 July 1864; England
- Died: 18 February 1939 (aged 74); Australia
- Occupations: Playwright; actress
- Known for: Play writing, Producing, Directing

Catherine Clarissa Howarde (28 July 1864 – 18 February 1939), as stage name Kate Howarde, was an actress, playwright, producer and director. She is best known for her play Possum Paddock (1919). The talented Howarde also played a part in numerous roles as a playwright in over 10 plays from 1914-1938. She was the first Australian woman to direct a feature film.

== Early and personal life ==
Howarde, was born on 28 July 1864 to parents Edward George Jones and Harriett Hannah in England before migrating to New Zealand as a child.

Kate married her first husband William Henry de Saxe who was a musician; the pair married in Christchurch, New Zealand on 28 April 1884. The couple had one child together, Florence Adrienne (born 5 December 1884). Years went by and Saxe and Howarde separated. The registry has no exact dates when she separated from her first husband.

On 26 November 1904, the Kate Howarde Dramatic Theatre company opened for a season at Perth's Theatre Royal, the line up included Scottish comedian and singer Elton Black, the pair hit it off and the two were later married. Records do not show how long Black had been in the country prior to the pair getting married. Shortly after, in May 1905, the pair set their sights for America and remained overseas for some four and a half years. Howarde died from cerebral thrombosis on 18 February 1939.

== Career ==
The late 1890s saw big things for Howarde when she adopted the stage name Kate Howarde; she began touring Australia and performing in different settings such as tents and halls. She formed a company which consisted of her two younger brothers and her sister. Kate Howarde and her company continued touring Australia and New Zealand up until 1905. The company was involved in such things as occasionally staged pantomimes and burlesques some of which included Sinbad the Sailor (1897), Little Jack Sheppard, Aladdin and Diavolo.

Howarde's big break came with the play Possum Paddock which was released in 1919. The play was written, produced and presented by Howarde. The play brought such success she decided to turn it into a film, which she also starred in, produced, co-directed and co-scripted along with Charles Villiers. This was the first Australian feature film to be co-directed by a woman, making Howarde a female pioneer within the emerging Australian film industry. The film was set to be released on 29 January 1921.

The success of Possum Paddock gained her stardom in the business which led to a 10-month tour across several companies. Howarde did not make any more films but continued to write many more plays with her company which were also great success, the last play she wrote was Judgement of jean Calvert before her death in 1939.

== Writing credits ==
- When the Tide Rises
- Under the Southern Cross
- The White Slave Traffic (1914)
- Why Girls Leave Home (1914)
- Possum Paddock (1919)
- The Limit (1921)
- The Bush Outlaw (1923)
- Find Me a Wife (1923)
- Gum Tree Gully (1924)
- Common Humanity (1927)
- The Newlyweds (1930)
- The Judgement of Jean Calvert (1935)
- Koala Valley (1938)
