= The Hayseeds' Back-blocks Show =

- Directed by: Beaumont Smith
- Written by: Beaumont Smith
- Produced by: Beaumont Smith
- Starring: Tal Ordell; Fred MacDonald
- Cinematography: A. O. Segerberg
- Production company: Beaumont Smith Productions
- Release date: 5 November 1917
- Running time: 4,000 feet
- Country: Australia
- Language: silent

The Hayseeds' Back-blocks Show is a 1917 Australian rural comedy from director Beaumont Smith. It was the third in his series about the rural family, the Hayseeds.

It is considered a lost film.

== Synopsis ==
Dad Hayseed and his friends from Stoney Creek, including Dad Duggan, Cousin Harold, Sam, Tom, Poppy, Molly, Peter, Hopkins and M'Arthur, decide to hold an agricultural show. They go to Brisbane to ask the Governor of Queensland to open it and he agrees. They form a brass band to play, and the show is a great success.

== Cast ==
- Fred MacDonald as Jim Hayseed
- Tal Ordell as Dad Hayseed
- Harry McDonna as Cousin Harold
- Agnes Dobson
- Collet Dobson

== Production ==
Like the first two Hayseed movies, Beaumont Smith used local appeal to make them attractive to audiences. This one was shot around Brisbane. It was followed by The Hayseeds' Melbourne Cup.

== Reception ==
The Bulletin wrote the film "is full of variety, as it touches on the farm, an agricultural show and a bush sports-meeting, besides supplying street views, with good clean comedy and a neat little love-story."
