= A Journey Through Filmland =

1921 film by Beaumont Smith

- Directed by: Beaumont Smith
- Produced by: Beaumont Smith
- Release date: February 1921
- Country: Australia
- Language: silent

A Journey Through Filmland is a 1921 documentary about Hollywood made by Beaumont Smith during his visit there. It includes appearances from Charlie Chaplin, Douglas Fairbanks, Warren Kerrigan, Mildred Harris, Ben Turpin, Wallace Reid and Bill Hart.

There was a scene of director James Cruze getting married.
