= Lacey Percival =

Australian cinematographer

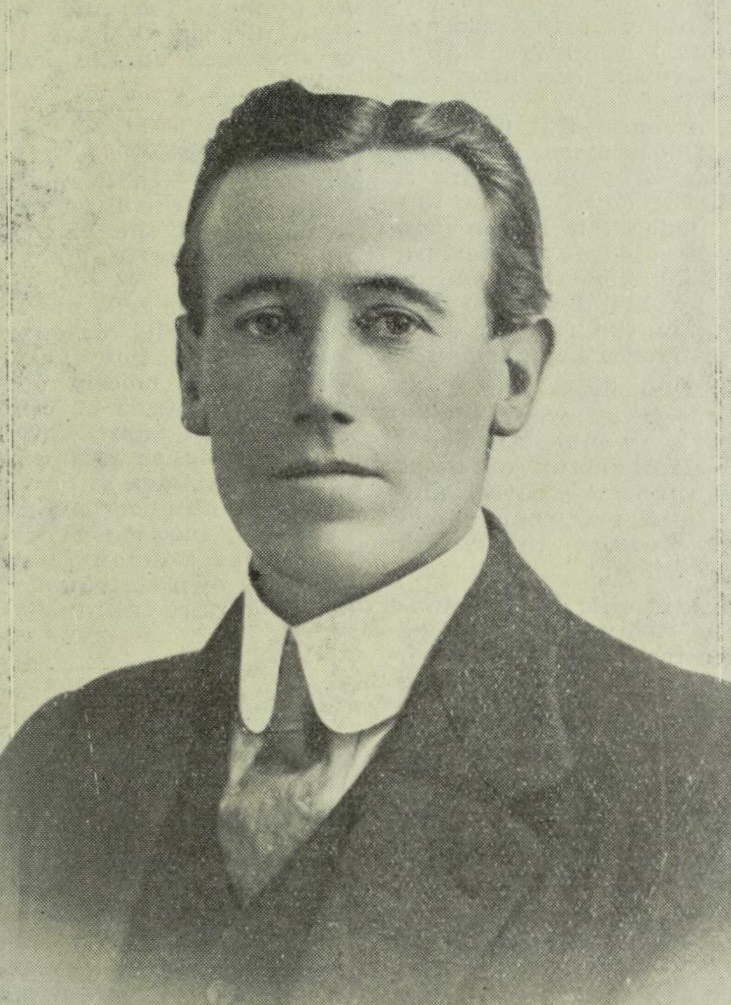
- Portrait of Lacey Percival (published in 1923).
- Born: Edgar Charles Lacey Percival; 11 February 1885; Glebe, New South Wales, Australia.
- Died: 7 August 1968 (aged 83); Manly, New South Wales, Australia.
- Occupation: cinematographer
- Spouse: Catherine Blanche Morris
- Parent(s): Andrew Percival & Bertha Adelaide (née Theakston)

Lacey Percival (11 February 1885 – 7 August 1968) was an Australian cinematographer who worked on many early Australian silent films. He worked for the Australian Photo-Play Company then joined West's Pictures. When that company merged with Australasian Films he ran their weekly newsreel, Australasian Gazette until 1925.

Two years later he went to work for Automatic Film Laboratories, then in 1935 established Percival Film Laboratories which he ran until his retirement in 1948.

== Filmography ==
- The Golden West (1911)
- The Martyrdom of Nurse Cavell (1916)
- £500 Reward (1918)
- His Convict Bride (1918)
- Cupid Camouflaged (1918)
- The Face at the Window (1919)
- Desert Gold (1919)
- The Man from Snowy River (1920)
- Robbery Under Arms (1920)
- Possum Paddock (1921)
- The Betrayer (1921)
- The Dinkum Bloke (1923)
- The Dingo (1923)
- Prehistoric Hayseeds (1923)
- The Digger Earl (1924)
- Dope (1924)
- Joe (1924)
- Painted Daughters (1925)
- Around the Boree Log (1925)
- The Mystery of a Hansom Cab (1925)
- The Adventures of Algy (1925)
- The Sealed Room (1926)
- Tall Timber (1926)
- Down Under (1927)
- The Birth of White Australia (1928)
- The Kingdom of Twilight (1929)
- Among the Hardwoods (1936)
