= The Birth of White Australia =

1928 film

- Directed by: Phil K. Walsh
- Written by: Phil K. Walsh
- Starring: Bert Trawley
- Cinematography: Lacey Percival; Walter Sully
- Production company: Dominion Films
- Release date: 24 July 1928
- Running time: 6,000 feet
- Country: Australia
- Languages: Silent film English intertitles
- Budget: £3,000

The Birth of White Australia is a 1928 Australian silent film directed by Phil K. Walsh. It is an historical drama about the settlement of white Australia, including scenes of Captain Cook's landing at Botany Bay, skirmishes with Australian Aborigines and the Lambing Flat riots. This was Australia's last silent feature film, thanks to the advent of "talkies".

== Plot ==
The film moves back and forth in time. It covers Captain Cook's landing at Botany Bay, clashes with Australian aborigines, and the discovery of gold. The main plot concerns the Lambing Flat riots, which is depicted as partly being caused by the Chinese attempting to murder a white girl after she criticises them for washing their clothes in the drinking water. The film ends with the introduction of legislation restricting Chinese immigration.

== Cast ==
- Bert Trawley as John Davis
- Dot McConville as Mary Davis
- Rita Aslin as Miss Dinah Myte
- Alice Layton as Madame Sefton
- Frank Hardingham as Tom Kendrick
- Pietro Sosso as Portuguese Dick
- Gamboola, "last of the Lachlan River chieftains"

Aboriginal actors from Yass and Batemans Bay appeared in the opening scenes depicting life before colonization.

The leading man, has been named as Lionel Henry, and the leading lady, Miss O'Brien, "a Sydney girl".

Dot McConville, a resident of Leeton, was well-known as a champion horsewoman.

Scenes of cattle mustering were shot at "Eubindal" station, Binalong with many citizens of the Yass district taking part, notably E. de Mestre of Binalong, Jack Garry and P. Garry, of "Glengarry", Frank Bennett of "Mylora," and C. Cunningham, of "The Lagoon".

J. T. O'Neill, Mollie Donoghue and Rita Aslin are cited as taking part. Sarah Musgrave, a 96 year-old pioneer of the Young district, also featured in the film.

There is also an appearance by Billy Hughes and other dignitaries, seen in the section depicting the opening of Federal Parliament.

== Production ==
The film was entirely financed by the townspeople of Young, New South Wales. Walsh formed the production company in February 1927 and raised capital of £5,000 of which £3,000 was allocated to the film. Most of the investors were local farmers.

Shooting began in September 1927, with most of the cast coming from Young. Chinese were played by whites wearing stockings over their faces.

== Reception ==
The film had its premiere at the Young "Strand Theatre" in September 1928, and despite full houses over three nights was shown nowhere else and is believed to have lost its investors money. Dominion Films went into liquidation in 1931, and all footage associated with its production was offered for sale by tender. Walsh did not attempt another movie.

The complete original film was recovered in 1965 from where it had been stored in the Young Town Hall. Modern critics have compared its production and acting unfavourably to The Birth of a Nation of a decade earlier, whose tone is similarly deprecated. It was shown in its entirety in October 1993 at the Pordenone silent movie festival in a screening run in partnership with the Australian National Film and Sound Archive and the New Zealand Film Archive. The film, which ran to 90 minutes, created a distinctly disturbed reaction from filmgoers, presumably discomfited by its unashamedly racist theme.
