= The Hayseeds =

1933 film

- Contemporary advertisement for film
- Directed by: Beaumont Smith; Raymond Longford (associate)
- Written by: Beaumont Smith
- Produced by: Beaumont Smith
- Starring: Cecil Kellaway
- Cinematography: Tasman Higgins
- Edited by: Frank Coffey
- Music by: Alf Lawrence; Fred Chapple
- Production company: J.C. Williamson Picture Productions
- Distributed by: British Empire Films
- Release date: 8 December 1933
- Running time: 98 mins
- Country: Australia
- Language: English
- Budget: £4,500 or £6,000
- Box office: £20,000 or £16,000

The Hayseeds is a 1933 Australian musical comedy from Beaumont Smith. It centres on the rural family, the Hayseeds, about whom Smith had previously made six silent films, starting with Our Friends, the Hayseeds (1917). He retired from directing in 1925 but decided to revive the series in the wake of the box office success of On Our Selection (1932). It was the first starring role in a movie for stage actor Cecil Kellaway.

It was also known as The Hayseeds Come to Town.

== Plot ==
Wealthy Mary Townleigh gets lost in the bush and hurts her ankle, but is rescued and stays with the Hayseed family. She starts a romance with their neighbour, Englishman John Manners. When Joe Hayseed and his girlfriend Pansy Regan decide to get married, the Hayseeds and John visit Sydney to stay with the Townleighs. John is accused of being a fugitive of justice but is eventually proved innocent and he and Mary get married.

== Cast ==
- Cecil Kellaway as Dad Hayseed
- Kenneth Brampton as Mr. Townleigh
- Arthur Clarke as John Manners
- Shirley Dale as Mary Townleigh
- Bryan Kellaway as Billy
- John Moore as Henry Westcott
- Tal Ordell as Joe Hayseed
- Vincent Pantin as Lord Mornington
- Molly Raynor as Pansy Ragen
- Phyllis Steadman as Polly
- Stan Tolhurst as Sam
- Katie Towers as Mum Hayseed
- the J.C. Williamson Chorus (singing hikers)
- the Richard White Girls
- Jimmy Coates and his Orchestra

== Production ==
The movie was part financed by the theatrical firm JC Williamsons, who loaned many of their regular actors and crew to the film. Frank Tait, managing director of Williamsons, said "We have had films in mind for some time. The Hayseeds will give us some definite experience to work on. With so many players available to us and plays of which we hold the rights, we regard film-making as a definite adjunct to our business."

Filming commenced in July 1933. That month Kellaway said "I was handed the script this morning for 'Hayseeds.' It all seems very confusing to me; it is so disjointed. Evidently, the producer has a lot to do."

Some of the scenes were shot at Cinesound's studios in Rushcutter's Bay in August and September 1933, with location work near Pymble. Many of the cast, including Kellaway, John Moore and Shirley Dale, were appearing in the play Music in the Air during filming.

The movie included several songs and dance sequences. The latter were produced by Richard White, who ran a dance academy in Sydney.

Cecil Kellaway's son, Brian, made his film debut alongside his father.

=== Director ===
In July 1933, Beaumont Smith announced that Raymond Longford would direct the picture, and some newspapers of the era also gave the credit to Longford. However, in the end Smith directed it himself. Longford was credited as an Associate Director.

== Songs ==
- "Let's Call It a Day" - lyrics Edmund Barclay
- "Night in the Bush" - lyrics Edmund Barclay music Frank Chapple - sung by Shirley Dale
- "The Song of the Hikers"
- "By the Camp Fire"
- "The Hikers Ballet" by Richard White

== Reception ==
The film opened in Sydney in December 1933.

=== Critical ===
Reviews for the film were mixed.

The Sun was enthusiastic, describing it as "a fresh note in Australian picture — a blend of musical comedy, country life, farce, and romance."

Everyone's reported that "from the sole viewpoint of entertainment value, the picture measures up to around average merit, but it is disappointing to see such experienced players as John Moore and Shirley Dale put forward the uninspired and stilted performances they do... Acting honors are easily won by the two players interpreting the burlesque caricature characterisations, Molly Rayner and Tal Ordell."

However, a number of reviews suggested that the representations of Australians were a weakness. The Sydney Morning Herald complained that "the antiquated sentiment and the absurdly stilted dialogue of the original come staring all too plainly through... There are humorous passages on the screen; but, somehow or other, the farce has become toned down... Unfortunately, the production as a whole does not suggest Australian characters, or the basic qualities of Australian life."

The Bulletin also took issue with the representation of country Australians. "No doubt such characters are meant for caricatures, but even a caricature should have some re-semblance to truth. It is time such films as "The Hayseeds" and "On Our Selection" were dropped, even though the producers and exhibitors may be able to claim, like the old-time vaudeville singer, that "it's getting them the money." These libels on our up-country folk may not do much damage here, but they are likely to create a disastrous impression of Australians in Britain and the U.S.A."

Years later Stephen Vagg of Filmink who, while arguing Kellaway was "miscast", called the movie:

Kind of fun and endearingly odd. All the talk about drought and banks and being broke, while manufactured, have a basis of truth and would’ve meant a lot to depression era audiences; there are genuinely funny moments such as Kellaway and Ordell dressing up as Ned Kelly to help a friend; the songs are charmingly weird; the romantic scenes are entertainingly campy; the Busby Berkley-style number at the end is quite good; the sets and locations are pretty; there’s a fun bit where the Hayseeds visit Sydney; and the whole movie reeks of a genuine love of Australia which is engaging.

=== Box office ===
The film proved popular with audiences on release in Australia and New Zealand. By the end of 1934 it was estimated to have earned £16,000 in Australia and an overall profit of £5,900. A 1938 article said the film had earned more than £30,000. The film was occasionally still screening in cinemas in 1950.

In late 1933 Frank Tait expressed interest in Williamsons making more movies. However this did not happen.
