= Townies and Hayseeds =

1923 Australian film

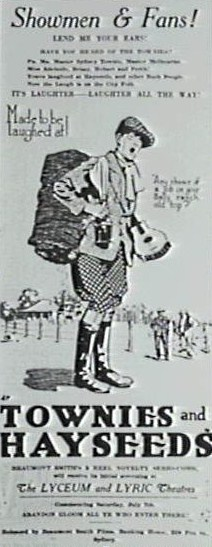
- Original advertisement
- Directed by: Beaumont Smith
- Written by: Beaumont Smith
- Produced by: Beaumont Smith
- Starring: George Edwards; Lotus Thompson
- Cinematography: Arthur Higgins
- Production company: Beaumont Smith Productions
- Distributed by: Beaumont Smith; Union Theatres
- Release dates: 7 July 1923 (Sydney); 13 August 1923 (Melbourne)
- Running time: 5,000 feet
- Country: Australia
- Language: silent

Townies and Hayseeds is a 1923 Australian film comedy from director Beaumont Smith. It is the fifth in his series about the rural family the Hayseeds.

It is considered a lost film.

== Synopsis ==
City-dweller Pa Townie goes to the country for a holiday with his wife Ma and children Sydney, Melbourne, Adelaide, Brissy, Perth and Hobart. They stay with the Hayseed family, who they then invite to stay at their place in Potts Point. In a romantic subplot, Pa Townie's daughter Adelaide (Lotus Thompson) is pursued by a returned serviceman, George, and an English "new chum" called "Choom".

The film has satirical elements including a "suicide club" at The Gap in Sydney, with Pa Townie trying to commit suicide, and a send up of former Prime Minister Billy Hughes.

== Cast ==
- George Edwards as Pa Townie
- JP O'Neill as Dad Hayseed
- Pinky Weatherly as Mum Hayseed
- Ada S Claire as Ma Townie
- Lotus Thompson as Adelaide Townie
- W.J. Newman as Choom
- Gordon Collingridge as George Fisher
- Ena Aldworth
- J Rayner
- Freddie Tauchert
- Gwen Gamble
- Matthew Gamble
- Jim Coleman
- Gloria Lloyd Weatherly
- Jack Tauchert
- Harold Parkes

== Production ==
The film was written, produced and sold within five weeks in May 1923 with shooting taking place in and around Sydney under the title The Townies.

Specific scenes and titles were added for the Melbourne and Adelaide release (e.g. Potts Point was changed to Toorak).

Everyone's said the film "is reported to be of a very unusual type, and breaks fresh ground as far as comedy photoplays are concerhed. It has many humorous topical skits in it, and we are given to understand Beaumont Smith, in constructing it, has had access to the humor of “Smith Weekly”. As, is always the case with this producer’s pictures, there will be no delay in placing the feature on the market."

== Reception ==
Everyone's said " Its early presentation is imperative, as it contains many topical skits that wii set Sydney laughing heartily."

The titles of the movie received praise for their cleverness. Indeed, one reviewer though the titles were funnier than the actual sequences themselves.

In August 1923 Smith shoot scenes in Melbourne and recut the film to be relocated in Melbourne for its release in that city.

The film enjoted successful seasons in Melbourne and Sydney and Smith sold the rights for other states.

The film was popular enough to lead to another in the series, Prehistoric Hayseeds.
