= Beaumont Smith =

Australian film director (1885–1950)

- Born: Frank Beaumont Smith; 15 August 1885; Hallett, South Australia, Australia
- Died: 2 January 1950 (aged 64); St Leonards, New South Wales, Australia
- Occupations: Director, producer
- Years active: 1913–1938
- Spouse: Elsie Fleming (m. 1911–1950; his death)

Frank Beaumont "Beau" Smith (15 August 1885 – 2 January 1950), was an Australian film director, producer and exhibitor, best known for making low-budget comedies.

Smith made his first film, Our Friends, the Hayseeds, in 1917. He went on to become one of the most prolific and popular Australian filmmakers of the silent era. Among his films were adaptations of the works of Banjo Paterson and Henry Lawson. His 1933 comedy The Hayseeds featured the first screen appearance of Cecil Kellaway.

Smith was famous for making his films quickly – sometimes he would complete shooting and post-production within one month for budgets ranging from £600 to £1,200. His wife Elsie would comment on his scripts and his brother Gordon looked after company finances. He was sometimes known as "One Shot Beau" or "That'll Do Beau".

A 1925 profile on the director stated:

Though he is by no means the pioneer of Australian motion picture producers, he is the daddy of them all by I'eason of the number of films he has produced [then seventeen]... He is his own financier and has not found it necessary to float a company to stand behind his products. There are many who sneer at some of them, but it is a fact that they have all made money for Beaumont Smith and the showmen who have screened them, and what more could any man ask... Exactly what there is about the Beaumont Smith films it is hard to say. There was with some of the earliest a crudeness that was apparent, yet they are all devised with cunning that speaks of showmanship of the highest degree and as such they get over flaws and all and the general impression defies criticism.

== Early life and career ==
Smith was born in Hallett, South Australia, named after a popular singer at the time, Armes Beaumont. He was educated at East Adelaide Public School.

Smith won writing competitions as a teenager. He first worked as a journalist, writing for The Critic and The Register. When he was around 19 he established a small newspaper, Seaside Topics, in the Victor Harbor region, which had a short run. Smith then helped C. J. Dennis found The Gadfly, which ran for several years.

Smith moved from Adelaide to Sydney in 1907 to work for The Bulletin as a writer and advertising manager. He also worked at The Lone Hand.

=== Theatre work ===
Smith moved into theatre, becoming secretary for theatrical entrepreneur William Anderson. He also worked as press secretary for Anderson's representative.

Smith toured Europe in 1909 and 1911. During the latter visit he arranged for a European troupe of midgets, "Tiny Town", to tour Australia. It was enormously successful, making a profit of 425%. Smith later toured the show in South Africa, where it was a success, and Canada, where it flopped due to opposition from existing circuses. He also toured a show by the suffragette Muriel Matters. It was not a success, he claimed, because the main market, suffragettes, could see her at women's clubs for free.

Smith tried playwriting, working on an adaptation of On Our Selection by Steele Rudd. He wrote the first act on his own and then collaborated with Rudd. The play was eventually rewritten by Bert Bailey to great success.

In 1914 he went into theatre management. He toured the plays Mr Wu (1914), The Barrier by Rex Beach, No Mother to Guide Her, A Girl's Cross Roads and The Glad Eye.

He was a fan of the works of Henry Lawson and adapted several of his stories for stage and film, including While the Billy Boils. Smith adapted Seven Little Australians into a play and toured it in 1914–15. He also wrote a play with Edward Dyson, Two Battlers and a Bear, and a review, Stop Your Nonsense.

== Film career ==
Our Friends, the Hayseeds (1917) was shot in South Australia. Many of the cast had appeared in Smith's theatrical productions of While the Billy Boils and Seven Little Australians. It was successful and Smith followed it with The Hayseeds Come to Sydney (1917), shot in Sydney, The Hayseeds' Back-blocks Show (1917), shot in Brisbane, and The Hayseeds' Melbourne Cup (1918), filmed in Melbourne.

Smith's first non-Hayseed film was a wartime melodrama, Satan in Sydney (1918). He followed it with Desert Gold (1919), a race horse story, and the comedy Barry Butts In (1919) starring Barry Lupino.

In May 1919 Smith ceased producing films until better terms for exhibiting them could be found. The Bulletin reported that "Smith, who has turned out more winners than any other producer in this country, reckons that unless fresh arrangements are made by the booking houses the day of the Australian film is numbered."

Smith recommenced production in October. He spent a number of months in Hollywood, then returned to Australia to make The Man from Snowy River (1920). In July 1920 he was called "the only really independent picture producer in Australia. He is sole proprietor of his producing business, using no outside capital, so is in a position to turn out just what class of picture he chooses. "

Smith travelled to New Zealand to make the inter-racial romance The Betrayer (1921), then back in Australia did While the Billy Boils (1921), adapted from the stories of Henry Lawson (which Smith had previously adapted for the stage). He made the drama The Gentleman Bushranger (1922).

In April 1922 Smith was about to go to London. He said his "future production plans hinge entirely on whether I can market some of my pictures in England or not." Smith declared that if out of his twelve films he "failed to market at least three" (The Man From Snowy River, A Maid of Maoriland, and The Gentleman Bushranger) then "I will know that the time has come to acknowledge defeat as an Australian picture producer. On the other hand, if I find a reasonable market in England, I intend to enter into some sort of partnership arrangement with an English producing company which will release four or six Australian productions each year... Failing some such assurance of an outside market, I will discontinue production indefinitely. We cannot now produce solely for the local market, cost of production is too high."

Smith then returned to Hayseed comedies with Townies and Hayseeds (1923) and Prehistoric Hayseeds (1923). He made two films starring Arthur Tauchert, The Digger Earl (1924) and Joe (1924). He then made two comedies starring Claude Dampier, Hullo Marmaduke (1925) and The Adventures of Algy (1925). In 1925 Everyones reported that:

Beau Smith still remains to prove beyond a shadow of doubt that the moving picture industry in Australia is a healthy and profitable game. So far he has not created an epic. He has never set himself out to do so. He aims to produce marketable pictures for Australian audiences and so far has succeeded admirably. As a native product he should be proud of his exploits. He is entirely unorthodox in his methods, because be there an accepted way to do things he will do it the opposite and get away with it. In work he is an object lesson to some of the producers and on location is more often than not taken for the chief mechanist, as he is busy here and there arranging props, adjusting lights and doing a hundred and one things that a producer ought not to do. He usually writes his own scenarios, but possibly uses them to paper the walls of his office, since on location this useful adjunct is usually conspicuous by its absence of be it there it is camouflaged as portion of the properties, or as a rest for the cameramen, or anything but its proper use, and he relies on his memory solely for the movements of his characters. He claims to make pictures on a basis of sound economy which permits him to release the same at a reasonable price to the showmen.

=== J C Williamsons ===
Shrinking profits led to Smith retiring from film-making in 1925. He moved to New Zealand and became managing director of Williamson Films (New Zealand) Ltd (later J. C. Williamson Picture Corporation Ltd), Wellington.

=== Return to filmmaking ===
Smith returned to filmmaking to make The Hayseeds (1933), giving Cecil Kellaway his first lead in a film, and Splendid Fellows (1934). The box office failure of the latter prompted him to retire permanently from filmmaking.

Smith went back to Williamsons but eventually he and his wife sold their interests in 1937 for £15,000 with an additional £7,000. He retired to Killara, Sydney in 1938.

== Personal life ==
Smith was married to Elsie Fleming from 1911 until his death. She was often an uncredited contributor with his work, helping him write scripts.

His brother Gordon managed his finances.

=== Death ===
Smith died on 2 January 1950 in Royal North Shore Hospital, St Leonards. He was survived by his wife Elsie. He was cremated at Northern Suburbs Crematorium.

== Legacy ==
The National Library of Australia tracked down a collection of 300 reels of Smith's films, including all his features. However, when the researchers arrived to collect it they were told that the entire collection had been burnt within the previous weeks, on the advice of an insurance company because of the film's inflammable nature.

== Selected filmography ==
- Our Friends, the Hayseeds (1917)
- The Hayseeds Come to Sydney (1917)
- The Hayseeds' Back-blocks Show (1917)
- The Hayseeds' Melbourne Cup (1918)
- Satan in Sydney (1918)
- Desert Gold (1919)
- Barry Butts In (1919)
- The Man from Snowy River (1920) – based on the poem by Banjo Paterson
- A Journey through Filmland (1921) – documentary
- The Betrayer (1921)
- While the Billy Boils (1921) – based on the stories of Henry Lawson
- The Gentleman Bushranger (1922)
- Townies and Hayseeds (1923)
- Prehistoric Hayseeds (1923)
- The Digger Earl (1924)
- Joe (1924) – based on the story by Henry Lawson
- Hullo Marmaduke (1925)
- The Adventures of Algy (1925)
- The Hayseeds (1933)
- Splendid Fellows (1934)

== Selected theatre credits ==
- Seven Little Australians (1916)
- While the Billy Boils (1916) – adaptation
- Joe Wilson and His Mates (1916) – adaptation
