= Dorothy Graham =

Dorothy Graham may refer to:

- Dorothy Graham, character in Bad Blood (TV series)
- Dorothy Graham, character in Know Thy Child
- Dorothy Graham, character in Tom (TV series)
- Dorothy Graham, character in The Way of a Maid
