= A One Man Game =

1927 film

- Directed by: Ernst Laemmle
- Screenplay by: William Berke
- Starring: Fred Humes; Fay Wray; Harry Todd; Clarence Geldart; Norbert A. Myles; Lotus Thompson
- Cinematography: Harry Mason; Alan Jones
- Production company: Universal Pictures
- Distributed by: Universal Pictures
- Release date: January 30, 1927
- Running time: 50 minutes
- Country: United States
- Language: Silent (English intertitles)

A One Man Game is a 1927 American silent Western film directed by Ernst Laemmle and written by William Berke. The film stars Fred Humes, Fay Wray, Harry Todd, Clarence Geldart, Norbert A. Myles, and Lotus Thompson. The film was released on January 30, 1927, by Universal Pictures.

== Plot ==
As described in a film magazine, Fred Hunter, the uncouth and unshaven owner of Black Butte Ranch and one of the directors of the local bank, makes a bitter enemy of Steve Balan when he casts the deciding vote against giving Balan a big loan on slim security. Balan threatens to do him harm. Hunter knocks him down and warns him to leave the county. After the fracas, Hunter is introduced to Mrs. DeLacey and her daughter Millicent, sister and niece of Jake Robbins, a neighboring rancher. Both are social upstarts and accomplished snobs. They turn a cool side to the ill kempt Hunter, earning the contempt of Roberta, Jake's daughter, who is called Bobby and is affectionately referred to as "Jake's only son." Just to see how much difference a few clothes will make, Hunter rigs himself out like a Broadway sheik and visits the Robbins ranch under the title, "the Duke of Black Butte." With a clean shave he is completely disguised. The women fall for the sham and Millicent plays a bold hand for the favor of the "duke." Hunter is so well pleased with his progress that he determines to win the young city woman or bust, much to the distress of Bobby, who is disgusted with his performance, but does not give him away. She discovers that she loves Hunter herself and decides to give Millicent some competition. When she dons some more traditional female clothing, it occurs to Hunter for the first time that Bobby is a woman, but he fails to take her seriously and makes a date with Milly to go riding at night. Vowing to save Hunter from the vixen, Bobby attacks her cousin and locks her in a closet while she puts on the riding togs that Milly has laid out for herself, and then goes galloping off with Hunter, who assumes that the young woman at his side is Milly. Hunter now realizes that Milly is not the girl for him. They stop at a spring where he tells his companion that he does not love her — that Bobby is the woman he is going to marry. Just then he is held up by the Balan gang, who have plotted to kidnap the duke and hold him for ransom. Balan is delighted when he finds that he has captured his old enemy. He places Hunter and Bobby in the charge of two of his men and then rides to the bank, where he forces the president to hand over a wallet full of bank notes. He lays the old man cold and then strides out, to be struck down by Hunter, who has escaped from Balan's men. After the rest of the bandits are rounded up, Hunter rushes Bobby to the office of the Justice of the Peace for the wedding.

== Cast ==
- Fred Humes as Fred Hunter
- Fay Wray as Roberta
- Harry Todd as Sam Baker
- Clarence Geldart as Jake Robbins
- Norbert A. Myles as Stephen Laban
- Lotus Thompson as Millicent Delacey
- William Malan as John Starke
- Julia Griffith as Mrs. Delacey

== Preservation ==
With no prints of A One Man Game located in any film archives, it is a lost film.
