= The Rawhide Kid (film) =

1928 film directed by Del Andrews

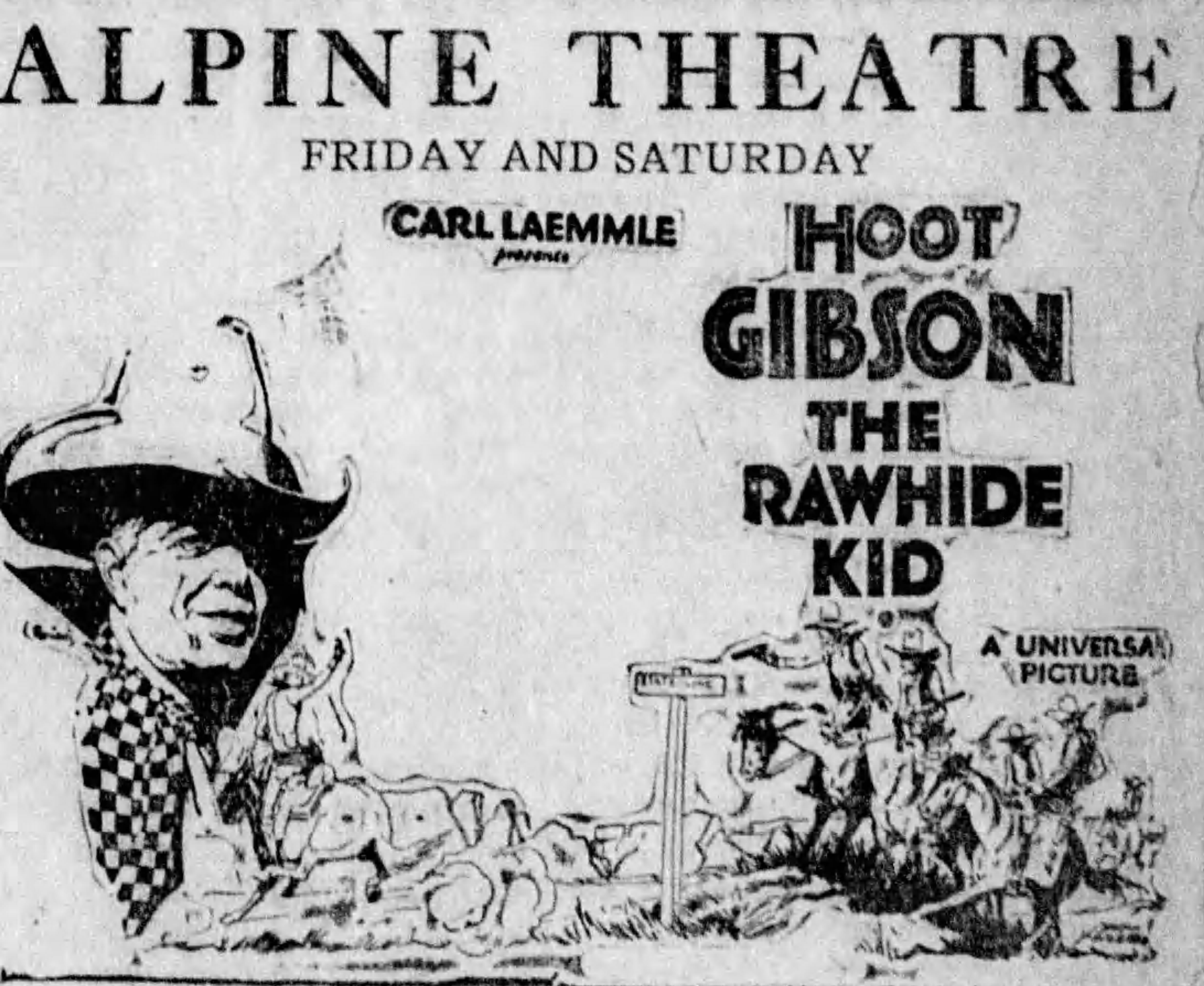
- Newspaper advertisement
- Directed by: Del Andrews
- Written by: Isadore Bernstein; Arthur Statter; Tom Reed
- Story by: Peter B. Kyne
- Produced by: Carl Laemmle
- Starring: Hoot Gibson
- Cinematography: Harry Neumann
- Edited by: Rodney Hickok
- Distributed by: Universal Pictures
- Release date: January 28, 1928
- Running time: 6 reels
- Country: United States
- Language: Silent (English intertitles)

The Rawhide Kid is a 1928 "ethnic" American silent Western film directed by Del Andrews and starring Hoot Gibson. It was produced and released by Universal Pictures.

== Cast ==
- Hoot Gibson as Dennis O'Hara
- Georgia Hale as Jessica Silverberg
- Frank Hagney as J. Francis Jackson
- William H. Strauss as Simon Silverberg
- Harry Todd as Comic
- Thomas G. Lingham as Deputy

== Preservation ==
With no prints of The Rawhide Kid located in any film archive, it is a lost film.
