= Two-up =

Traditional Australian gambling game

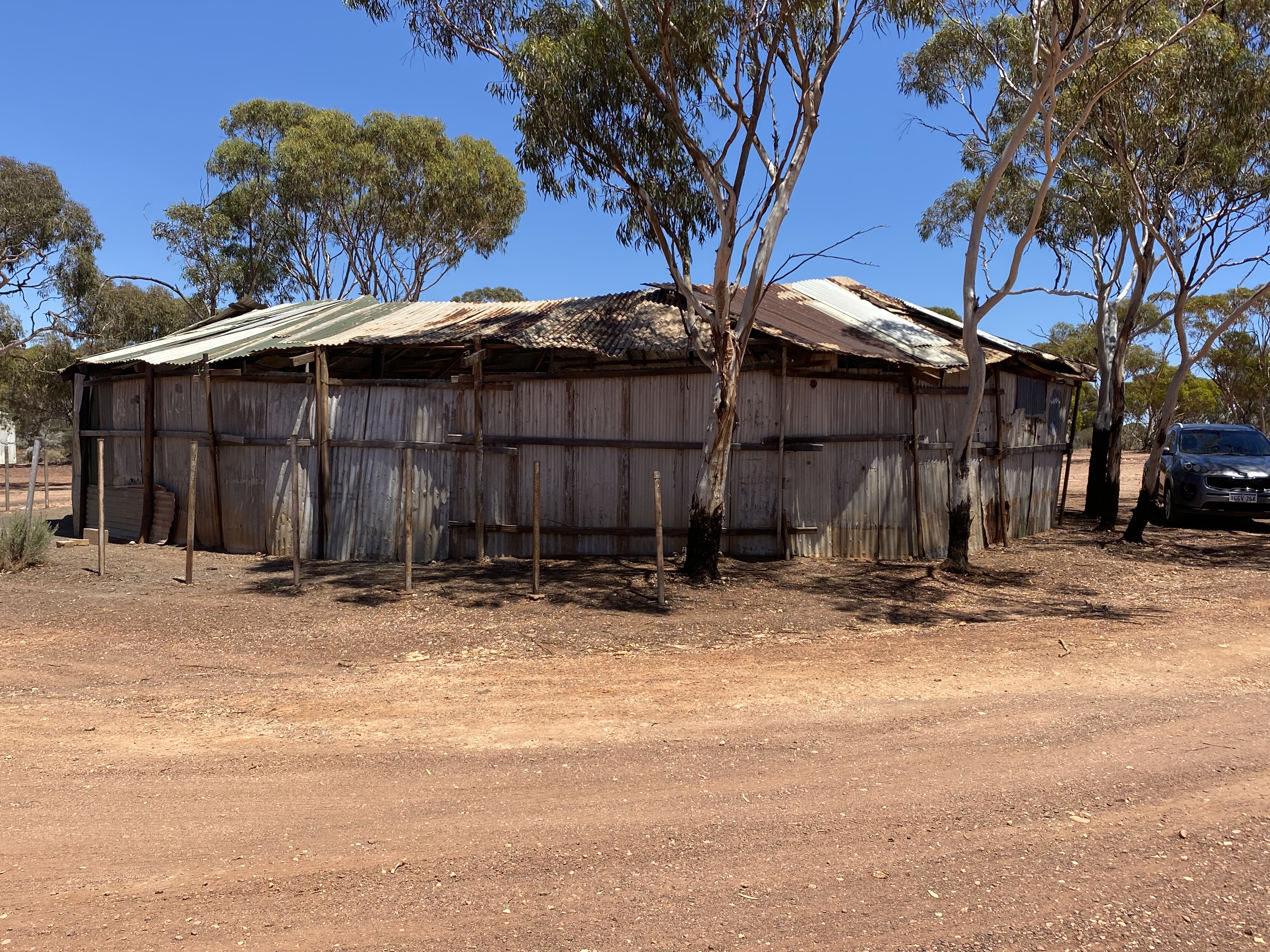
Outside view of the two-up shed in Kalgoorlie, Western Australia

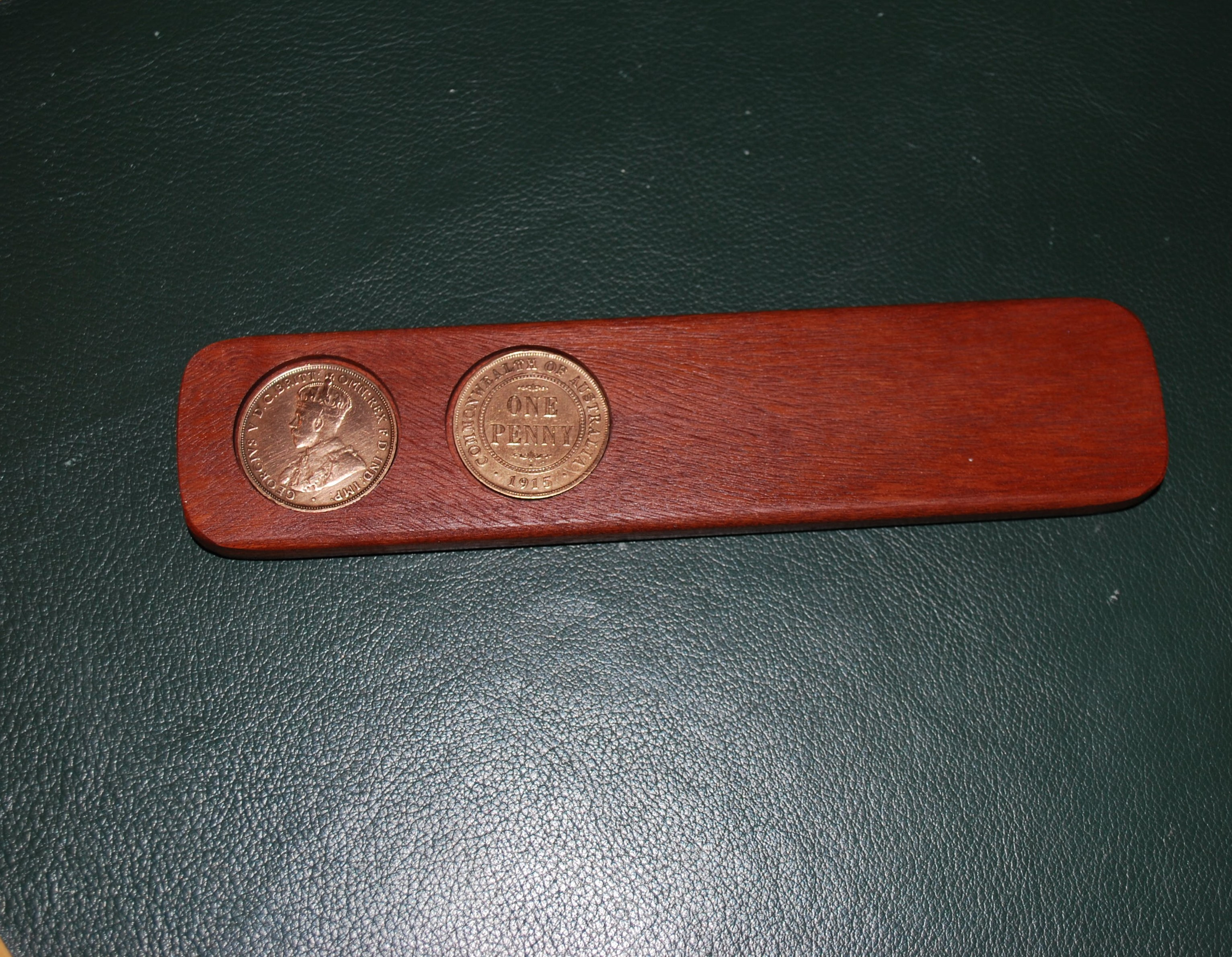
Two original 1915 Australian pennies in a kip from which they are tossed. 1915 is significant as the year of the Gallipoli campaign which is remembered annually on Anzac Day

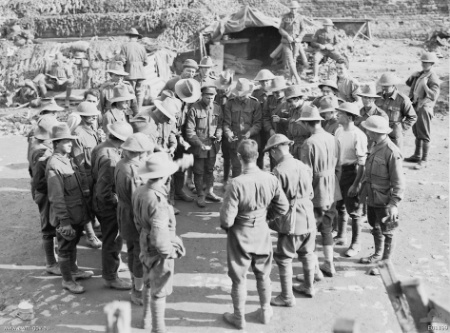
Australian soldiers playing two-up during World War I at the front near Ypres, 23 December 1917

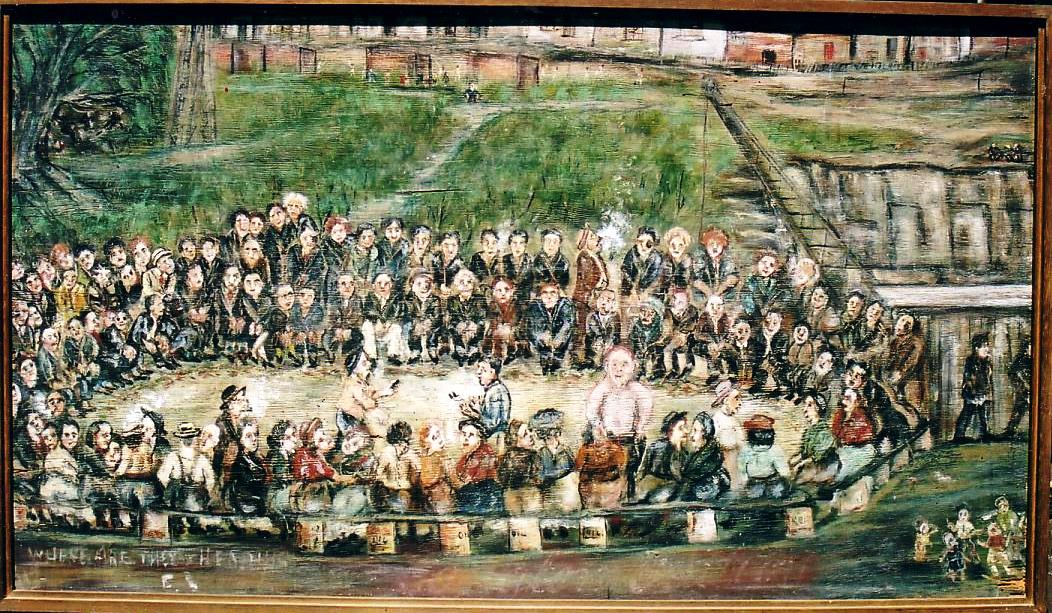
Painting of two-up game. Paddington, Sydney. Unknown artist. 1890s

Two-up is a traditional Australian gambling game, involving a designated "spinner" throwing two coins, usually Australian pennies, into the air. Players bet on whether the coins will both fall with heads (obverse) up, both with tails (reverse) up, or one of each (known as "odds"). The game is traditionally played in pubs and clubs throughout Australia on Anzac Day, in part to mark a shared experience with diggers (soldiers).

The game is traditionally played with pennies, because their weight, size, and surface design make them ideal for the game. Weight and size make them stable on the "kip" and easy to spin in the air. Decimal coins are generally considered to be too small and light and do not fly as well. The design of pre-1939 pennies had the sovereign's head on the obverse (front) and the reverse was totally covered in writing, making the result very easy and quick to see. However, pennies used in the game are usually now marked with a white cross on the tails side. Pennies being used at games on Anzac Day are brought out specifically for that purpose each year.

== History ==
The exact origins of two-up are obscure, but it seems to have evolved from cross and pile, a gambling game involving tossing a single coin into the air and wagering on the result. Two-up was popular amongst poorer English and Irish citizens in the 18th century.

The predilection of convicts in Australia for this game was noted as early as 1798 by New South Wales's first judge advocate, as well as the lack of skill involved and the large losses. By the 1850s, the two-coin form was being played on the goldfields of the eastern colonies, and it spread across the country following subsequent gold rushes.

Two-up was played extensively by Australia's soldiers during World War I. Gambling games, to which a blind eye was cast, became a regular part of Anzac Day celebrations for returned soldiers, although two-up was illegal at all other times.

As time passed, increasingly elaborate illegal "two-up schools" grew around Australia, to the consternation of authorities but with the backing of corrupt police. Kalgoorlie has Australia's only year-round legal two-up school.

The popularity of two-up declined after the 1950s as more sophisticated forms of gambling like baccarat gained popularity in illegal gaming houses and poker machines were legalised in clubs.

Legal two-up arrived with its introduction as a table game at the new casino in Hobart in 1973, but is now only offered at Crown Perth and Crown Melbourne. Two-up has also been legalised on Anzac Day, when it is played in Returned Servicemen's League (RSL) clubs and hotels. Several tourist "two-up schools" in the Outback have also been legalised. Under the NSW Gambling (Two-Up) Act 1998, playing two-up in NSW is not unlawful on Anzac Day.

Terminology
| Term | Meaning |
|---|---|
| School | The collective noun for a group of gamblers playing two-up. |
| Ring | The area designated for the spinner to spin the coins. The spinner must stand in the ring to spin, and the coins must land and come to rest within the ring. |
| Spinner | The person who throws the coins up in the air. The opportunity to be the spinner is offered in turn to gamblers in the school. |
| Boxer | Person who manages the game, usually provides the equipment, monitors the betting, takes commission and does not participate in betting. |
| Ringkeeper (Ringie) | Person who calls the validity of each throw and looks after the coins between throws, to avoid loss or interference. Places the coins on the kip for the spinner when the betting round is complete, and calls "Come in, Spinner" to allow the throw to take place. Sometimes also known as the "Bender", for bending down to retrieve the coins. |
| Kip | A small piece of wood on which the coins are placed before being tossed. Sometimes the resting area for the coins is covered in canvas or leather to improve friction. In some games, coins are placed tails (white cross) up. In casino games the coins are placed with opposing (one head, one tail) sides up. |
| Toss the Kip | The Spinner hands the kip back to the Ringkeeper before a possibly losing throw, i.e. to retire after a winning throw. |
| Heads | Both coins land with the "head" side facing up. (Probability 25% (approximately)) |
| Tails | Both coins land with the "tails" side facing up. (Probability 25%) |
| Odds or "One Them" | One coin lands with the "head" side up, and the other lands with the "tails" side up. (Probability 50%) |
| Odding Out | To spin five "odds" in a row. (Probability 3.125%) |
| Come in, Spinner | The call given by the boxer when all bets are placed and the coins are now ready to be tossed. |
| "Barred" | The call when an illegal spin has occurred - the coins have not been thrown higher than the head, or did not rotate in the air. |
| Cockatoo | A look-out who warns players of imminent police raids. Dates from the time when playing two-up was illegal. |

The table below show the current bets that can be made at Crown Perth.

Casino Odds
| Bet Type | Casino Edge | Payout | Description |
|---|---|---|---|
| Single Head | 3.125% | 1–1 | Spinner spins a pair of heads before a pair of tails or odding out. |
| Single Tail | 3.125% | 1–1 | Spinner spins a pair of tails before a pair of heads or odding out. |
| 5 Odds | 9.375% | 28–1 | Spinner spins five odds in a row ("odding out") before either a pair of heads or a pair of tails. |
| Spinner's Bet | 3.400% | 15–2 | Only available to the current spinner. The spinner attempts to spin either three pair of heads or three pair of tails, and will win if they do so before either a) getting the opposite result or b) odding out. |

== Gameplay ==
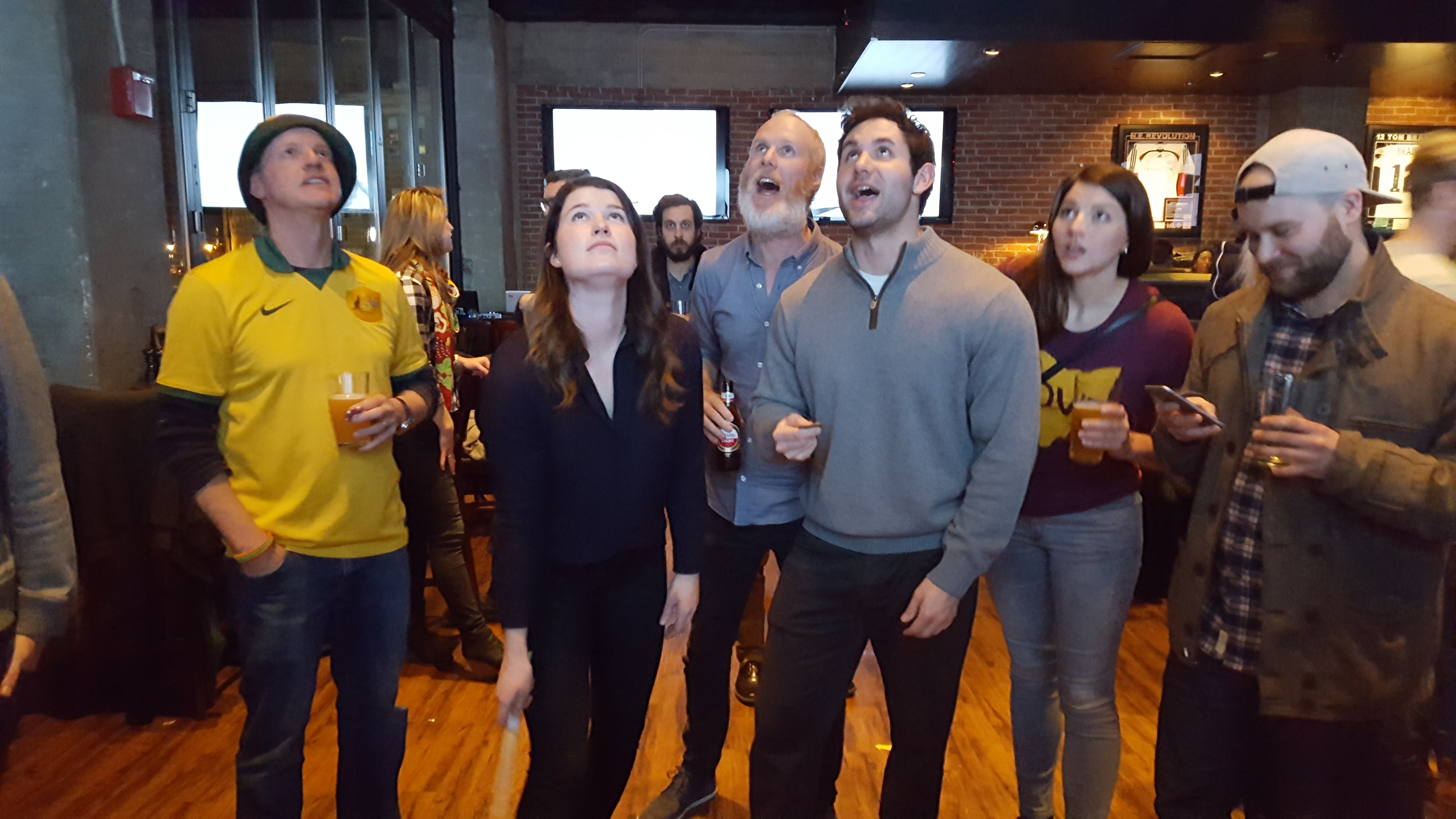
Celebrants playing two-up at the Australia Day Celebration in Boston, Massachusetts.

The Ringie selects a player as the spinner (generally greeted to loud calls of "Come in, Spinner!" from the rest of the players). The spinner tosses the coins in the air using the kip until they win (and continue spinning), lose (and the kip is offered to the next player around the ring), or toss the kip (take their winning wagers and retire).

The basic format of the game:

- Two heads means the spinner wins.
- Two tails means the spinner loses both their bet, and the right to spin.
- Odds ("one them") means head or tail bets are frozen, and the spinner throws again.

The spinner is required to place a bet (usually on heads) before their first throw which must be covered (equalled) by another player. If the spinner wins they keep the bet and cover, minus a commission which the boxer takes out of this bet. If the spinner loses, the entire bet goes to the player who covered the bet. This makes throwing the coins a slight losing proposition compared to a side bet; however, this is balanced by the interest of throwing the coins and the chance of adding a personal "lucky" touch to the spin. The disadvantage (cost of running the game) is shared about the School by the Kip being passed about the Ring during subsequent spins.

As a betting round and subsequent spin takes about a minute, and is resolved win/loss on average every three spins, then the Boxer's commission on wins is paid on average ten times per hour. i.e. If the Spinners' average wager is $20, covered by $20, and the commission is 10%, and then the Boxer will take $40 an hour in commission. The taking of commission has been made illegal for unlicensed games in most states, even when play is permitted (e.g. Anzac Day).

The other members of the school place side bets (bets against each other) on whether the coins will land heads or tails. These bets are offered by shouting the amount and preference (i.e. "Fifty dollars head!), perhaps while tapping the money on their head, until another player who wishes to bet on the opposite coin approaches them to cover the bet. The combined amount of the bet is traditionally held by the tail-better until the bet resolves (i.e. heads is thrown, and the combined bet is handed over to the head-better, or Tails is thrown and the combined bet is pocketed by the tail-better.) This usually results in the heavier/wealthier betters taking the "tails" bet, allowing them to cover a number of "heads" bets on each throw.

=== Variations ===
Some variations include:

- Throwing three coins, instead of two: As at least two coins will always match, this results in a decision on every throw (two heads or two tails, with the third coin being redundant—"sudden death"), and thus a faster game, with more action, as the bets are resolved on every throw; there is no pause in gambling when odds are thrown.
- The spinner only wins after a successive run of heads: I.e., if three heads are required before a tails, with any number of odds, then "odds, heads, odds, odds, heads, odds, heads" would be a win. Casinos pay this at 7.5 to 1. This speeds up play, as the Spinner can't "Toss the Kip" after a single throw (selecting a new spinner takes time, interrupting play).
- If the spinner throws successive odds. they lose; i.e., if five odds thrown before a tails loses while three heads are required to win, then "odds, heads, odds, odds, heads, odds, odds" would be a loss. Casinos use this rule to provide them with the edge they need to run the game, as the Casino collects all heads/tails bets if five odds in a row are thrown.
- In Casino games, the Spinner may bet on either heads or tails.
- In Casinos, no side bets are permitted; all bets are placed with the Casino as bank.
- The two-up game has been used to develop a quantum game called Quantum Two-Up in which the coins are entangled. To win the game, one has to discover the law of entanglement that favors a particular coin combination.

== Popular culture ==
The protagonist of C. J. Dennis' 1915 verse novel The Songs of a Sentimental Bloke suffers from an addiction to playing two-up.

In the 1921 Australian silent film A Girl of the Bush, directed by Franklyn Barrett, a school for two-up is shown in detail, including the way bets are placed and how the coins are tossed from the kip as the boxer squares up the play area and one of the players calls out "fair go"; the scene ends with a police raid.

In the 1940 film Forty Thousand Horsemen, the three leads, played by Grant Taylor, Chips Rafferty, and Pat Twohill, are introduced to us playing two-up in a marketplace.

The 1951 novel Come In Spinner by Dymphna Cusack and Florence James takes its name from the call.

In the 1960 film Hell Is a City set in Manchester, England, there is a scene in which robbers use stolen money to join in a gang of local men gathered on a hill behind the town to gamble "the toss". A thrower balances two pennies on two outstretched fingers and then tosses them high in the air to see how they land. The thrower wins with double heads and loses with double tails. Other men in the crowd cover his bets (bet against him), with a "boxer" handling the money and keeping track of the bets. Lookout men with binoculars and whistles sat by upper windows of nearby buildings to warn of police arriving.

The 1960 film The Sundowners contains a sequence in which a group of Australian drovers, including Robert Mitchum's character, play a game of two-up, with appropriate bets. One of the players calls out "fair go", which translates roughly as "play fair". Appropriately, the action in the game on-screen is rapid and without hesitations or false starts.

The 1971 film Wake in Fright contains scenes where the main protagonist, a schoolteacher named John Grant, staying in a semi-fictional mining town based on Broken Hill for one night, initially makes significant winnings in a game of two-up, before subsequently losing everything again.

In 1978, the Australian group Little River Band released their fourth album, Sleeper Catcher, which featured the band and others on the cover playing the game. In the liner notes it says:

Sometimes called "Australia's National Game", two-up is a form of gambling which, though illegal, has long been a favourite pastime. The "Sleeper Catcher", an accepted participant in the game, retrieves bets left on the floor by tardy backers.

There is a sequence in the 1987 film The Shiralee starring Bryan Brown which makes reference to the game.

The Australian rock group AC/DC has a song called "Two's Up" on their 1988 Blow Up Your Video album that references the game.

Terry Pratchett's 1998 novel The Last Continent includes a parody of Two-Up in which two coins are flipped up into the air and players bet on whether or not they are going to come down again.

During the broadcast recording of the 'Tin Symphony' segment of the opening ceremony of the 2000 Olympic Games, there are two scenes of settlers playing two-up outside a tin home.

The Australian-themed 2002 video game Ty the Tasmanian Tiger features a tutorial area named "Two-Up".

On 17 November 2004, the Premier of New South Wales remarked in the New South Wales Legislative Assembly:

One of the charities most involved in problem gambling, the Wesley Community Legal Service, a body dealing with problem gamblers, has confirmed it has never encountered a problem gambler addicted to two-up. That is an interesting bit of trivia for everyone to take home with them.

— Mr Bob Carr,

In 2009, the television program Underbelly: A Tale of Two Cities shows men taking part in games of two-up. In one instance the police enter the establishment in which this is taking place and the contestants run and hide the equipment being used and money being gambled.

In 2014, the television program Peaky Blinders depicts a game of two-up, with a car and a horse used for betting.

On 20 February 2015, a game of two-up featured in The Doctor Blake Mysteries, series 3, episode 2, titled "My Brother's Keeper".

== Kalgoorlie ==
Located approximately 7 kilometers from Kalgoorlie's CBD, the Kalgoorlie Two-Up Shed/ Ring is still Australia's only year round legal two-up venue, where games continue to be held every Sunday.

In a 1945 article for the Daily Mirror in Sydney, Frank Clune writes:

It is said that the gambling craze in Australia originated on the goldfields of Bathurst, Bendigo and Ballarat in the 1850s... At some later date - never accurately ascertained - the great Australian game of two-up was invented. It has been said, but never verified, that two-up originated on the goldfields of Western Australia, during the great Kalgoorlie and Coolgardie rush of the '90's.

The Kalgoorlie Two-Up School operated with limited interference during its early years until a police raid in 1952 led to the arrest of 42 men, despite reports that between 600 and 800 patrons were present that morning.

In 1982, the school attracted national attention when it was raided by police from Perth during the annual Race Round carnival, one of Kalgoorlie's largest visitor events. The raid resulted in significant public controversy, with many local residents viewing it as an intrusion into a longstanding Goldfields tradition.

Community opposition contributed to subsequent legislative reforms that ultimately enabled the game to be played legally a year later. Kalgoorlie mayor, Mr Ray Finlayson said:

"Australia-wide and worldwide, Kalgoorlie is recognised as the home of two-up, and if the wrong had not been righted it would have done irreparable damage to our racing round, because people come to Kalgoorlie to bet."

Bill Donovan, aged 95, of Kalgoorlie was the first to legally toss the coins at Kalgoorlie's two-up school on 25 July 1983.

The origins of two-up in Australia from the First Fleet, the beginnings of the Kalgoorlie Two-Up School in the 1890s gold rush, through to the legislation changes in 1983 are detailed in the book Heads and Tails: The Story of the Kalgoorlie Two-Up School by Danny Sheehan and Wayne Lamote.

The Kalgoorlie Two-Up ring was featured in the 2019 television series Upright, starring Tim Minchin and Milly Alcock. The venue serves as the setting for a brawl involving Minchin's character, Lucky.
