= Lotus Thompson =

Australian actress (1904–1963)

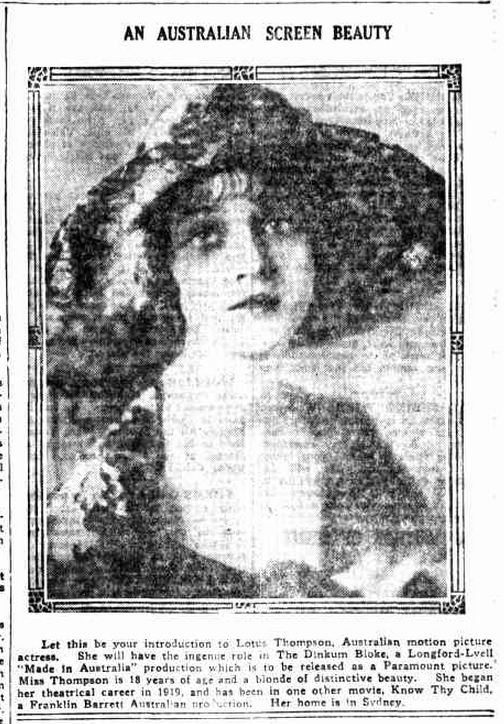
- Thompson featured in the Sunday Times newspaper in 1923
- Born: 26 August 1904; Charters Towers, Queensland, Australia
- Died: 19 May 1963 (aged 58); Burbank, California, U.S.
- Years active: 1921–1938, 1948–1949
- Spouses: Edward Churchill (m. 1929; div. 1936) Stanley Robinson (m. 1937)

Lotus Thompson (26 August 1904 – 19 May 1963) was an Australian actress of silent and sound films best remembered for a publicity stunt involving scalding her legs. Her film career began in Australia in 1921 and ended in California in 1949, during which time she appeared in 35 motion pictures. She died in California in 1963.

== Early life ==
Thompson was born in Charters Towers, Queensland, on 26 August 1904. As a child, the Australian youth showed talent in school and church theatricals. Thompson was considered a beautiful girl as a youth. When she was fifteen her admirers entered her in a beauty contest. She was awarded first prize by a unanimous vote of the judges. One of the judges was a young artist. He was asked his reason for selecting her. He remarked that he chose her not so much for the beauty of her eyes, head, or lovely complexion. Instead, he admired her legs most, as they were "the sort of limbs a Diana or Venus must have had at her age". The contest won for her the title as the most beautiful girl in Australia.

Her mother was encouraged to let her sign with a stock company as soon as her school days ended.

== Australian film career ==
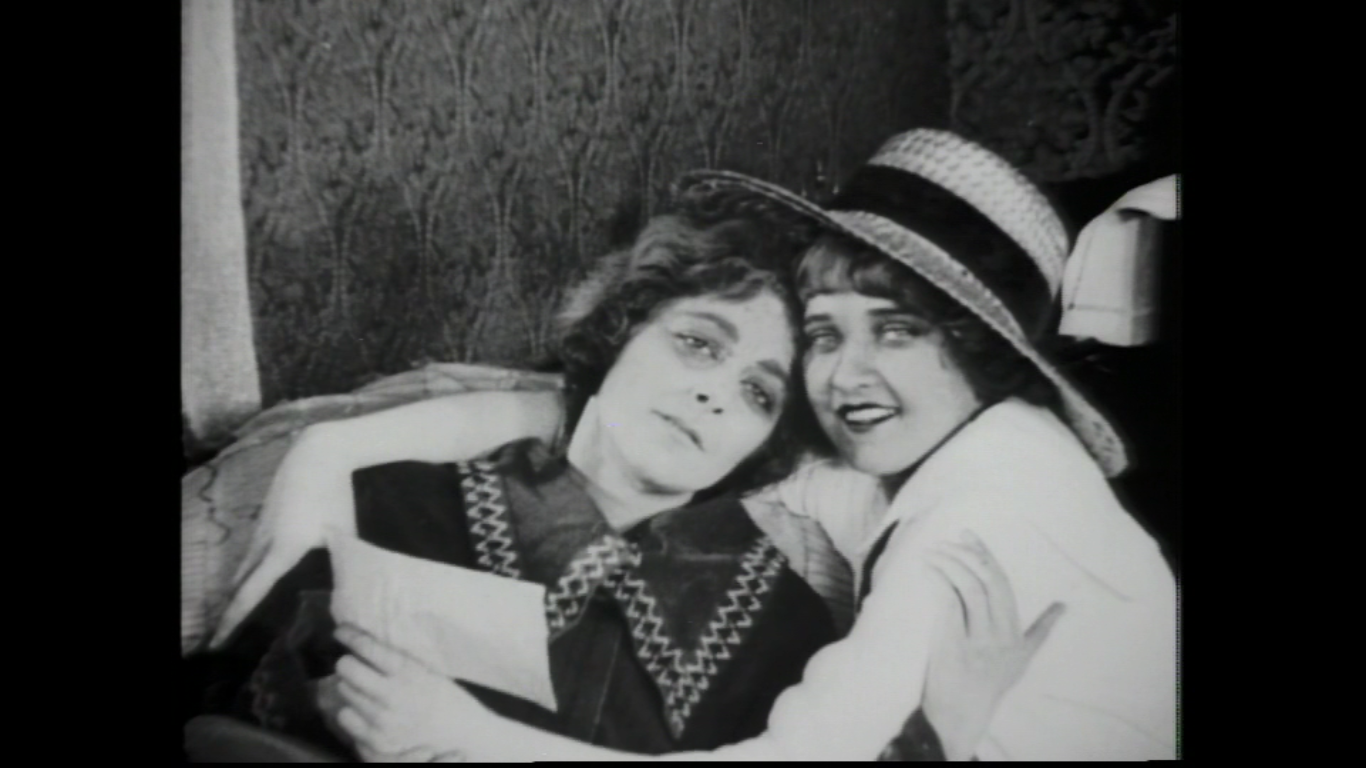
A still from Lotus Thompson's debut film Know Thy Child (1921). Lotus can be seen on the right, sitting next to co-star Vera James.

Thompson made her film debut aged seventeen in the 1921 Australian film Know Thy Child. According to the Sydney Truth "She is not yet seventeen and possesses all the ' requisites of the successful artiste." Thompson's performance earned her good reviews and her appearance was much publicised.

She appeared in a Mother Goose pantomime then got a good role supporting Arthur Tauchert in The Dinkum Bloke (1923), directed by Raymond Longford. Longford was the leading Australian director of the 1920s and Tauchert one of the biggest stars.

She had a lead role in the comedy Townies and Hayseeds. It was directed by Beaumont Smith who used Thompson in The Dingo. Publicity referred to her as "Australia's loveliest girl."

Smith used her again in Prehistoric Hayseeds and The Digger Earl.

== American film career ==
Mother and daughter set out for Hollywood on 5 March 1924, arriving in San Francisco on 25 March 1924.

Lotus was picked by a director from Paramount Pictures from among a crowd of applicants.

She contacted fellow Australian Enid Bennett, who had married director Fred Niblo. She came second in a beauty contest and did some screen tests. Pictures of her legs appeared in the paper.

She got work at Hal Roach studios and in the Fox sunshine comedies including The Folly of Vanity.

== Disfigurement ==
On the afternoon of 1 February 1925, she attempted to disfigure her legs for life. She burned herself from the hips down with a preparation she thought was nitric acid. She had bought the acid at a drug store the previous evening. She told the clerk there she wanted to remove some warts.

Her reason for marring herself had to do with her inability to secure roles other than parts in comedy and as a chorus girl. Her ambition was to play drama, which she had done in her native country. In America, each director was the same in his remarks to Lotus, "Your legs are too marvelous to ignore. You must show your legs. Here, jump into this bathing suit." In the aftermath, she was satisfied that directors and the movie public would never want to look at her legs again.

Her mother and a girlfriend were eating when they heard Lotus screaming in the bathroom. "I've fixed them now", Lotus reportedly said. "They will never want to look at them again."

The actress was rushed to the Ferry-Dickey-Cass private hospital by two Los Angeles Police Department detectives. The attending physician believed the vial used by Lotus did not contain nitric acid. Instead, it had the reaction of catharides, which if used in enough quantity, would cause disfigurement. If it were indeed nitric acid, the doctor said that he considered it a weak solution. The degree of disfigurement would be known in a few days.

She told the press at the time:

It's sickening. I wish I never had any legs. Drama is the ambition of my life. I played dramatic roles in Australia and I can play them here if they'll give me the chance. But they won't. They throw me into a bathing suit or a pair of tights. They say my figure is that of Venus. My legs are the shapeliest in films. Bah! I'm so sick of it all. I couldn't stand it any more so I decided to mar them so no one would want to look at them any more.

The day after, Miss Thompson received a bit of welcome news. Rudolph Valentino sent her a telegram promising her a part in his next film. He remarked about her irrational action, "I know nothing of your work, but anyone who has the courage to do as dramatic and insane a thing as you have done must have temperament and feeling."

Unfortunately, she did not have a chance to act with Valentino. He died the following year on 23 August 1926. However her rash act was carried in newspapers worldwide, and she received offers of bit roles from various casting directors. One of these was film executive Harry Rapf, who visited the young woman at her home as she was convalescing. He told her that she would have the opportunity to play in serious dramatic roles as soon as her legs healed.

In May 1925 an Australian paper ran an item which said the acid pouring did not occur and reports were a publicity stunt. However pictures of Lotus' bandaged legs appeared in the paper at the time.

== Later career ==
The incident did seem to get Thompson some roles. She was in some Westerns with Fred Humes, The Yellow Back and The One-man Band. She reportedly signed to Paramount Pictures who put her in Rough House Rosie with Clara Bow. She also appeared in Casey at the Bat.

In August 1926, Lotus had a supporting role in The New Champion, which dealt with a young blacksmith who had boxing ambitions.

In late 1926 she was listed as a possible WAMPAS Baby Star.

Other films included Flashing Fangs and Song o' My Heart. She had a part in Cecil B. de Mille's Madame Sin.

An August 1933 Los Angeles Times article made reference to Thompson among a list of actors who accepted $10 to $15 a day for bit roles in films. The piece noted that it was no reflection on the "former greats" that they accepted small roles. Instead it was noted that they always did their assignments well and "they keep the movie ball rolling." It was mentioned that the road back is a "tough one" and current stars may be out in a year or two.

== Final years ==
After ten years in retirement she appeared in Woman in White.

Lotus Thompson died in Burbank, California, on 19 May 1963.

== Personal life ==
Thompson was married twice. Her first marriage was to Edward Churchill, whom she married in 1929. The marriage ended in divorce in 1936, and she remarried the following year to Stanley Robinson. Neither of the marriages produced children.

== Partial filmography ==
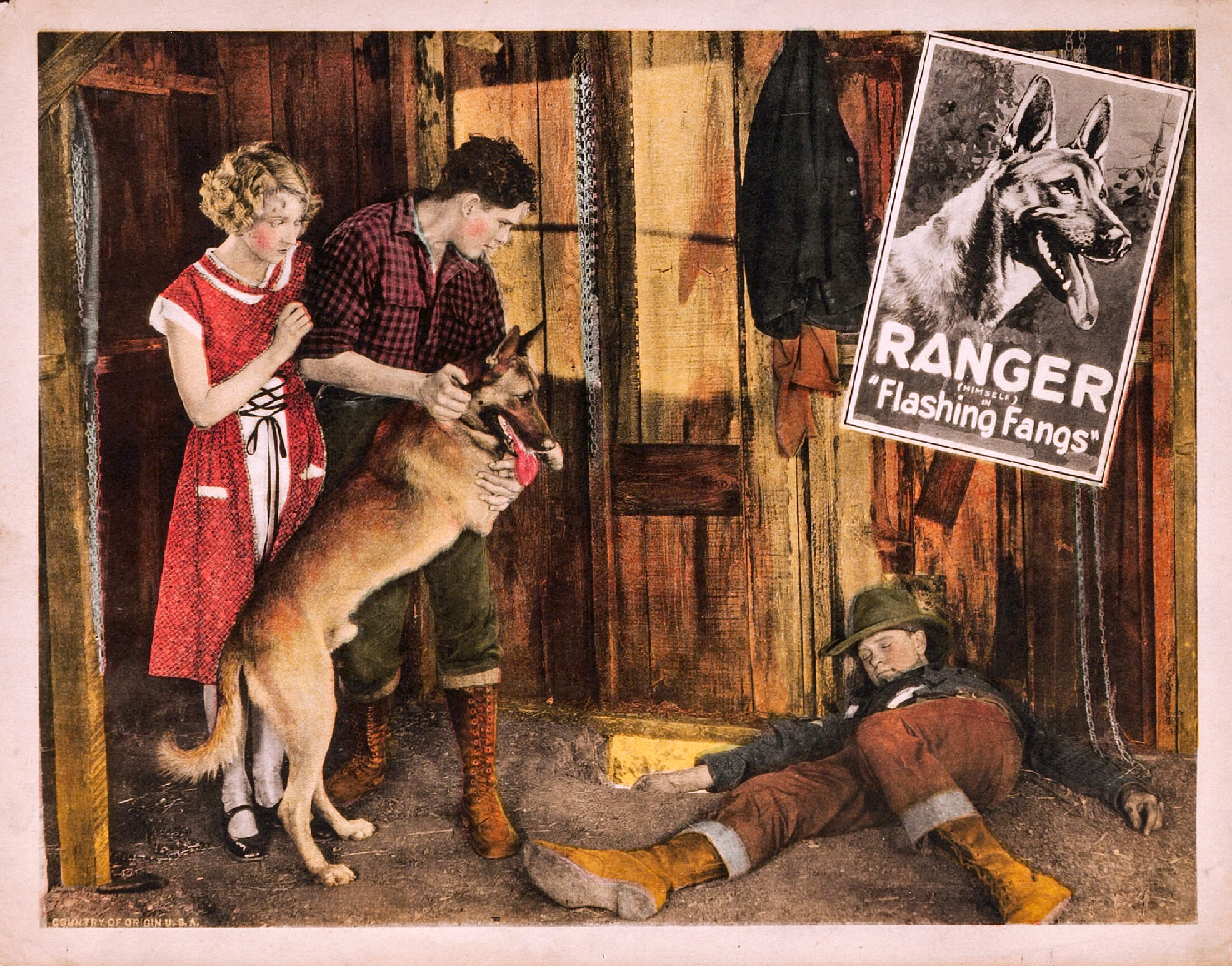
Lobby card for Flashing Fangs (1926)

- Know Thy Child (1921)
- Townies and Hayseeds (1923)
- Prehistoric Hayseeds (1923)
- The Dinkum Bloke (1923)
- The Digger Earl (1924)
- The Folly of Vanity (1924)
- The Iron Mule (1925)(short)
- The New Champion (1925)
- The Yellow Back (1926)
- Flashing Fangs (1926)
- Yellow Fingers (1926)
- A One Man Game (1927)
- Casey at the Bat (1927)
- Desert Dust (1927)
- The Crimson Canyon (1928)
- Man of Daring (1928) (short)
- The Port of Missing Girls (1928)
- In Line of Duty (1929) (short)
- 'Neath Western Skies (1929)
- The Phantom Rider (1929)
- A Tenderfoot Terror (1929) (short)
- The Lone Rider (1929) (short)
- Ridin' Leather (1929) (short)
- The Wilderness (1929)
- The Thrill Hunter (1929) (short)
- Cowboy Pluck (1929) (short)
- The Freckled Rascal (1929)
- Terry of the Times (1930)
- Madam Satan (1930)
- I Found Stella Parish (1935)
- Mutiny on the Bounty (1935)
- Ship Cafe (1935)
- Anthony Adverse (1936)
- The Prince and the Pauper (1937)
- Fools for Scandal (1938)
- Journey for Margaret (1942)
- National Velvet (1944)
- The Picture of Dorian Gray (1945)
- Woman Private (1949)
- The Red Danube (1949)
