= McGuire of the Mounted =

1923 film

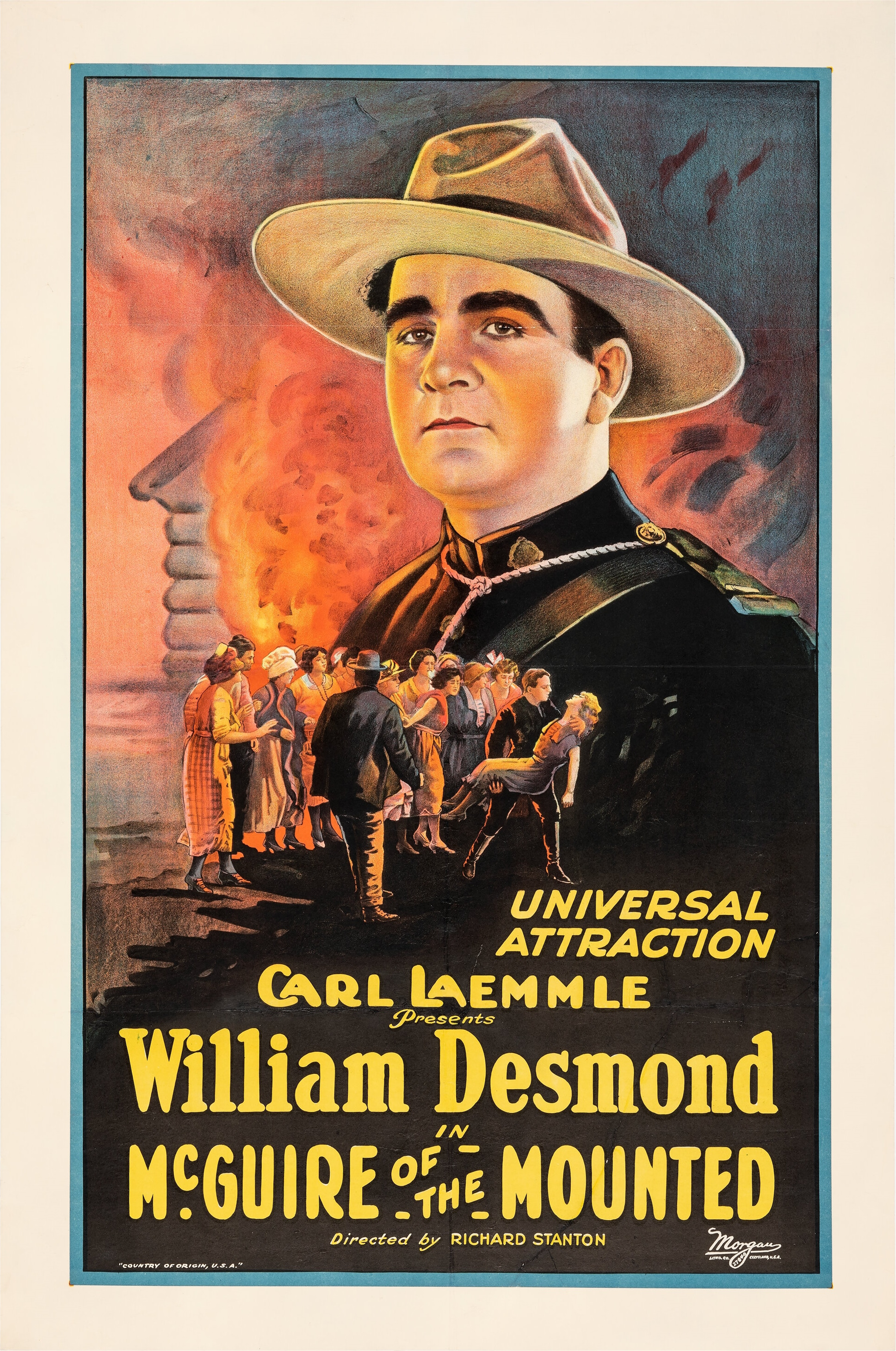
- Theatrical one-sheet release poster
- Directed by: Richard Stanton
- Screenplay by: George Hively
- Story by: Raymond L. Schrock; George Hively
- Starring: William Desmond; Louise Lorraine; Willard Louis; Vera James; J. P. Lockney; William Lowery
- Cinematography: Benjamin H. Kline
- Production company: Universal Pictures
- Distributed by: Universal Pictures
- Release date: July 9, 1923
- Running time: 50 minutes
- Country: United States
- Language: Silent (English intertitles)

McGuire of the Mounted is a 1923 American crime film directed by Richard Stanton and written by George Hively. The film stars William Desmond, Louise Lorraine, Willard Louis, Vera James, J. P. Lockney, and William Lowery. The film was released on July 9, 1923, by Universal Pictures.

== Plot ==
As described in a film magazine, Old André Montreau (Lockney), who runs a little ferry across and down a large stream in the Canadian woods, is found seriously wounded by Bob McGuire (Desmond), a member of the Northwest Mounted Police, and an old-time friend of the guide and his daughter, Julie (Lorraine). Andre tells him that he does not know who his assailant was, but describes him as best he can. Later McGuire and Julie become engaged and the old man dies from the effects of the wounds. Bill Lusk (Louis), the proprietor of the village saloon and dance hall, is in league with Decker (Johnson), who is engaged in smuggling dope over the border. They find that McGuire is on to them and plot to make him one of them so that they can continue their traffic unhampered. Katie (James), who Decker has in his power because of certain knowledge he possesses, is forced to put some drug in McGuire's punch while he is at the ball held that night in honor of the new wife (Browne) of Major Cordwell's (Lowery), who has just arrived. When McGuire wakes the next morning, he is horror-struck to learn that he is married to Katie. Katie finally comes to love McGuire, though he can never find it in him to forget his Julie. She refuses to carry on any further with the plans of Lusk and Decker, so they plan a new way of getting McGuire. They tell Katie that he is in love with Major Cordwell's wife and are ready to prove it if she will invite her to her house. They also tell the major to be present. As they had expected, the Major comes in while McGuire and Mrs. Cordwell are in a perfectly innocent, though somewhat compromising attitude. A fight ensues and Lusk, watching from the outside, fires his gun and kills the major. McGuire is accused and runs to Julie for refuge. Running back to the hotel after seeing the major killed, Katie is made a prisoner by Lusk and Henri while they prepare to make a getaway. In her attempts to free herself Katie overturns a lamp and starts a fire which threatens to destroy the place. One of McGuire's brothers in the service is sent out to bring him in and on the way back to the village they are told that the hotel is burning and that Katie is locked in. McGuire saves the girl. She is fatally burned, however, but before dying tells who the guilty party is.

== Cast ==
- William Desmond as Bob McGuire
- Louise Lorraine as Julie Montreau
- Willard Louis as Bill Lusk
- Vera James as Katie Peck
- J. P. Lockney as André Montreau
- William Lowery as Maj. Cordwell
- Peggy Browne as Mrs. Cordwell
- Frank Johnson as Henri Decker
- Jack Walters as Sgt. Murphy

== Preservation ==
With no prints of McGuire of the Mounted located in any film archives, it is a lost film.
