= Dancing Sweeties =

1930 film

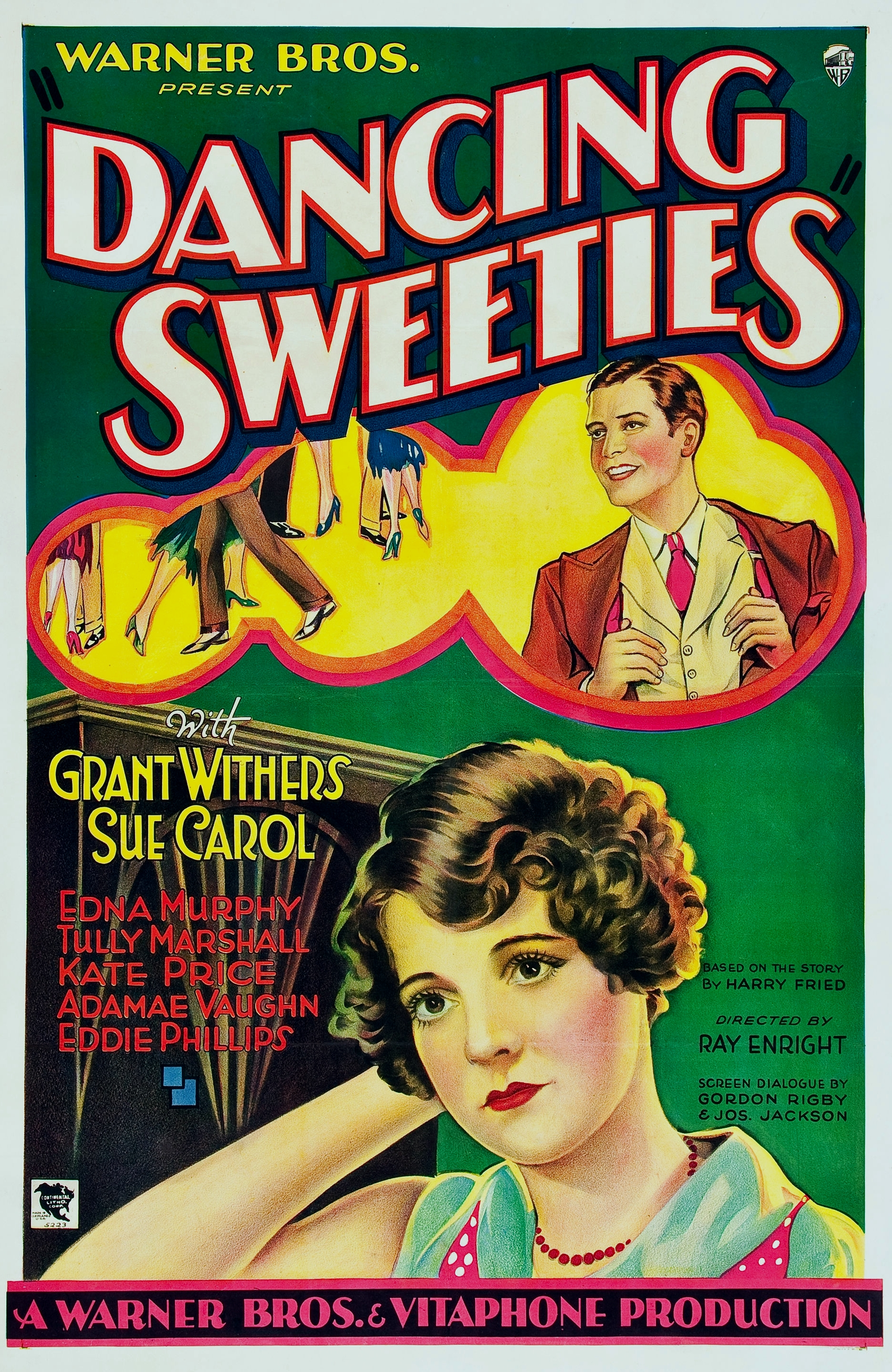
- Theatrical release poster
- Directed by: Ray Enright
- Written by: Gordon Rigby; Joseph Jackson
- Based on: "Three Flights Up" short story by Harry Fried
- Starring: Grant Withers; Sue Carol
- Cinematography: Robert Kurrle
- Edited by: George Marks
- Music by: Cecil Copping; Rex Dunn; Joseph Burke; Al Dubin
- Production company: Warner Bros. Pictures
- Distributed by: Warner Bros. Pictures
- Release date: July 19, 1930
- Running time: 62 minutes
- Country: United States
- Language: English

Dancing Sweeties is a 1930 American pre-Code musical romantic comedy film directed by Ray Enright and starring Grant Withers and Sue Carol. The film is based on the story Three Flights Up by Harry Fried. The film was produced and released by Warner Bros. Pictures on July 19, 1930.

Carol, then under contract to Fox Film, was loaned out to Warner Bros. for the making of this film.

== Plot ==
Dancing Sweeties (1930)

Bill Cleaver is a conceited dancer who spends all his free time dancing. He leaves his partner "Jazzbo" Gans, after seeing Molly O'Neil in the dance hall. He enters the waltz contest with Molly and ends up winning the first prize. Soon after they are convinced to marry by Jerry Browne, the dance hall manager, who needs a new couple to marry in a live ceremony in the dance-hall after another couple cancelled. He convinces them when he offers them a free furnished apartment which the other couple forfeited by not showing up. Bill's and Molly's parents are shocked by news of the marriage. Bill soon gets bored of home-life and the in-laws and yearns for dancing again. He convinces Molly to join him in a dance contest, but when she is unable to perform the dance steps of a new fox-trot, they fight. The fighting continues until they split up. After a while, Bill realizes what he has lost but thinks it may be too late to patch things up.

== Cast ==
- Grant Withers as Bill Cleaver
- Sue Carol as Molly O'Neil
- Tully Marshall as Pa Cleaver
- Edna Murphy as "Jazzbo" Gans
- Adamae Vaughn as Emma O'Neil
- Eddie Phillips as Needles Thompson
- Margaret Seddon as Mrs. Cleaver
- Sid Silvers as Jerry Browne

== Songs ==
- "The Kiss Waltz" (Sung by Grant Withers and Sue Carol)
- "Hullabaloo"
- "Dancing With Tears In My Eyes" (Cut from film before release)

=== Incidental scoring ===
- "If You Were Mine" from the 1929 film "Twin Beds"

== Preservation status ==
The film survives complete and is available on DVD by Warner Archive. It is also preserved at the Library of Congress.

== See also ==
- List of early Warner Bros. sound and talking features
