= The New Champion =

1925 film

- Directed by: B. Reeves Eason
- Written by: Dorothy Howell
- Starring: William Fairbanks; Edith Roberts; Lotus Thompson
- Cinematography: George Meehan
- Production company: Perfection Pictures
- Distributed by: Columbia Pictures
- Release date: September 1, 1925
- Running time: 50 minutes
- Country: United States
- Language: Silent (English intertitles)

The New Champion is a 1925 American silent sports action film directed by B. Reeves Eason and starring William Fairbanks, Edith Roberts and Lotus Thompson.

== Cast ==
- William Fairbanks as Bob
- Edith Roberts as Polly Brand
- Lotus Thompson as Lucy Nichols
- Lloyd Whitlock as Jack Melville
- Frank Hagney as 'Knockout' Riley
- Al Kaufman as Fight Promoter
- Marion Court as Mrs. Nichols
- Bert Appling as Blacksmith

== Preservation and status ==
A complete copy of the film is held at the UCLA Film & Television Archive.

== Bibliography ==
- James Robert Parish & Michael R. Pitts. Film directors: a guide to their American films. Scarecrow Press, 1974.
