= Flashing Fangs =

1926 film

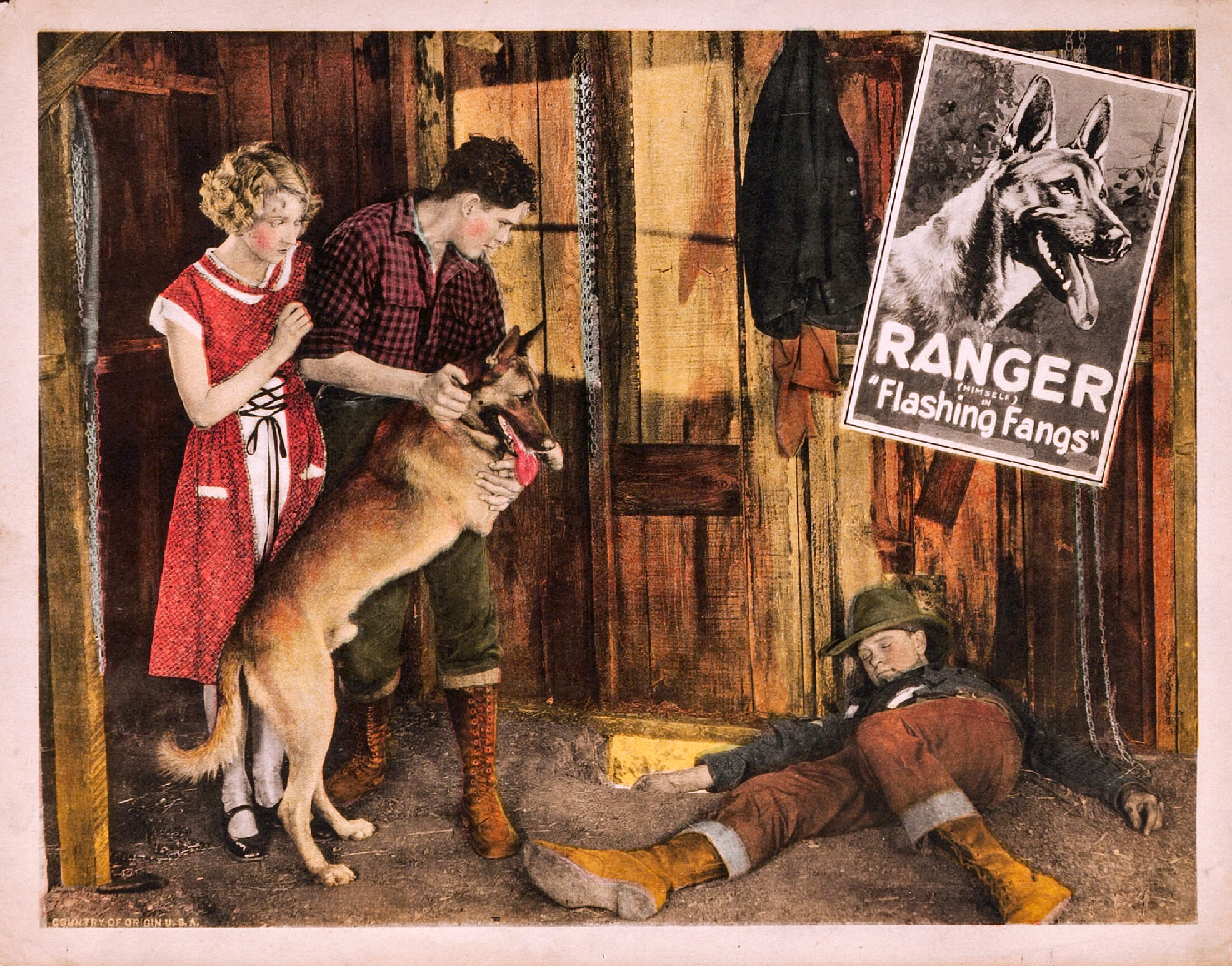
- Directed by: Henry McCarty
- Written by: Ewart Adamson
- Produced by: Joseph P. Kennedy
- Starring: Lotus Thompson; Eddy Chandler; Ada Mae Vaughn
- Cinematography: Glen Gano
- Production company: Robertson-Cole Pictures Corporation
- Distributed by: Film Booking Offices of America; Ideal Films (UK)
- Release date: September 5, 1926
- Running time: 54 minutes
- Country: United States
- Languages: Silent; English intertitles

Flashing Fangs is a 1926 American silent drama film directed by Henry McCarty and starring Lotus Thompson, Eddy Chandler and Ada Mae Vaughn. It was made a showcase for Ranger the Dog, one of many canine stars active in silent films during the decade.

== Cast ==
- Ranger the Dog as Ranger, a Dog
- Robert Ramsey as Dan Emory
- Lotus Thompson as Bessie Lang
- Eddy Chandler as 'Red' Saunders
- Clark Comstock as Andrew Lang
- Ada Mae Vaughn as June
- George Reehm as Sheriff
- Mary Dow as Baby

== Bibliography ==
- Connelly, Robert B. The Silents: Silent Feature Films, 1910-36, Volume 40, Issue 2. December Press, 1998.
- Munden, Kenneth White. The American Film Institute Catalog of Motion Pictures Produced in the United States, Part 1. University of California Press, 1997.
