= A Girl of the Bush =

1921 film

- Still from film
- Directed by: Franklyn Barrett
- Written by: Franklyn Barrett
- Produced by: Franklyn Barrett
- Starring: Vera James
- Production company: Barrett's Australian Productions
- Release date: 26 March 1921
- Running time: 6,000 feet
- Country: Australia
- Languages: Silent film English intertitles

A Girl of the Bush is a 1921 Australian silent film directed by Franklyn Barrett. It is one of the few films from Barrett to survive in its entirety today.

== Plot ==
Lorna Denver manages Kangaroo Flat sheep station and is pursued by two men, evil Oswald and handsome young surveyor, Tom Wilson.

Lorna gives shelter to a baby that has survived an attack by aboriginals, but Tom thinks the baby is hers. This upsets Lorna who breaks it off with him.

Oswald is murdered and Tom is arrested. A Chinese cook reveals that the real killer was the father of a woman who had been seduced by Oswald.

== Cast ==
- Vera James as Lorna Denver
- Jack Martin as Tom Wilson
- Herbert Linden as Oswald Keane
- Stella Southern as Grace Girton
- James Martin as John Burns
- Sam Warr as Sing Lee
- Emma Shea as Looe Toe
- D. L. Dalziel as James Keane
- Gerald Harcourt as Reg Howard
- Olga Broughton as Mary Burns
- Mick Huntsdale as Bill Tresle
- Tom Cosgrove as Bill's mate

== Production ==
The script was heavily influenced by the plays The Squatter's Daughter and On Our Selection.

This was the first of three films Barrett made for his own company. Shooting began in October 1920 at the Fremantle Station near Bathurst.

Filming was conducted both on studio sets and on location and the plot is interwoven with lengthy documentary-style passages that depict then-contemporary rural Australian activities such as sheep sheering and dipping, wool packing and transportation by horse team, cattle branding, and horse-breaking in the outback, as well as the playing of the illegal gambling game two up in the back alleys of Sydney.

== Reception ==
The film was widely distributed and appears to have been a success at the box office.

Vera James' father bought the rights to distribute the film in New Zealand.
