= Vera James =

New Zealand actress (1892–1980)

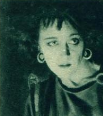
Vera James, in Bavu (1923)

Vera James Munro (born Vera Gwendoline James; 2 April 1892 – 19 October 1980) was a New Zealand actress who worked in theatre and film. In 1929, she appeared in the first all-talking, all-colour feature length movie ever made, Warner Bros On with the Show!, and was already well known for starring in A Girl of the Bush in 1921.

== Biography ==
James was born Vera Gwendoline James on 2 April 1892, the daughter of William Francis James and Alice Jane James (née Hill) of Dunedin, New Zealand. She moved to Australia in 1919 and appeared in two films for Franklyn Barrett. The first was A Girl of the Bush, which was screened in both Australia and New Zealand. Her performance in the lead role was widely praised for the versatility of her acting, her mimicry, feats of horsemanship, and her good looks. She had learned to ride horses and swim in order to land the role. The second film was Know Thy Child, in which James' character was first shown at the age of seventeen, then aged twenty-five, and finally aged about forty; "in each age she plays the part with restraint and dramatic skill".

After these successes, James moved to Hollywood in 1922, with her new husband, Arthur Henry Munro, who she had married on 29 June 1921 at the Presbyterian Church, Neutral Bay, Sydney. In Hollywood, James appeared in a B-Western, McGuire of the Mounted (1923), playing a member of a drug smuggling gang who was married to the hero while he was doped. She was cast in Bavu (1923), and appeared in pre-release publicity images, but does not appear in the cast list of the final release. James also had supporting roles in The Hunchback of Notre Dame (1923), The Radio Detective (1925) (a serial), Three Wise Men (1925) with Janet Gaynor and Ben Corbett, Fade-Away Foster (1926), and On with the Show! which was the first all-colour, all-talking full-length movie in history. She was one of the few New Zealand actors to find some fame in Hollywood at the time.

In 1928, James appeared in a production of the operetta The Desert Song. The Los Angeles Times described her as "not only pleasing to gaze upon, but is possessed of a beautiful contralto voice".

In 1929, James travelled back to Australia and New Zealand, intending to return to Hollywood the following year. However, there is no evidence that she did. She was offered parts after returning to Australia, but always turned them down. She went on to manage a beauty salon in Sydney. She died on 19 October 1980, in Sydney.

== Credits ==
- A Girl of the Bush (1921)
- Know Thy Child (1921)
- McGuire of the Mounted (1923)
- Bavu (1923) – role removed during post production
- Fade Away Foster (1926) (short)
- The Radio Detective (1926)
