= The Folly of Vanity =

1924 film by Maurice Elvey

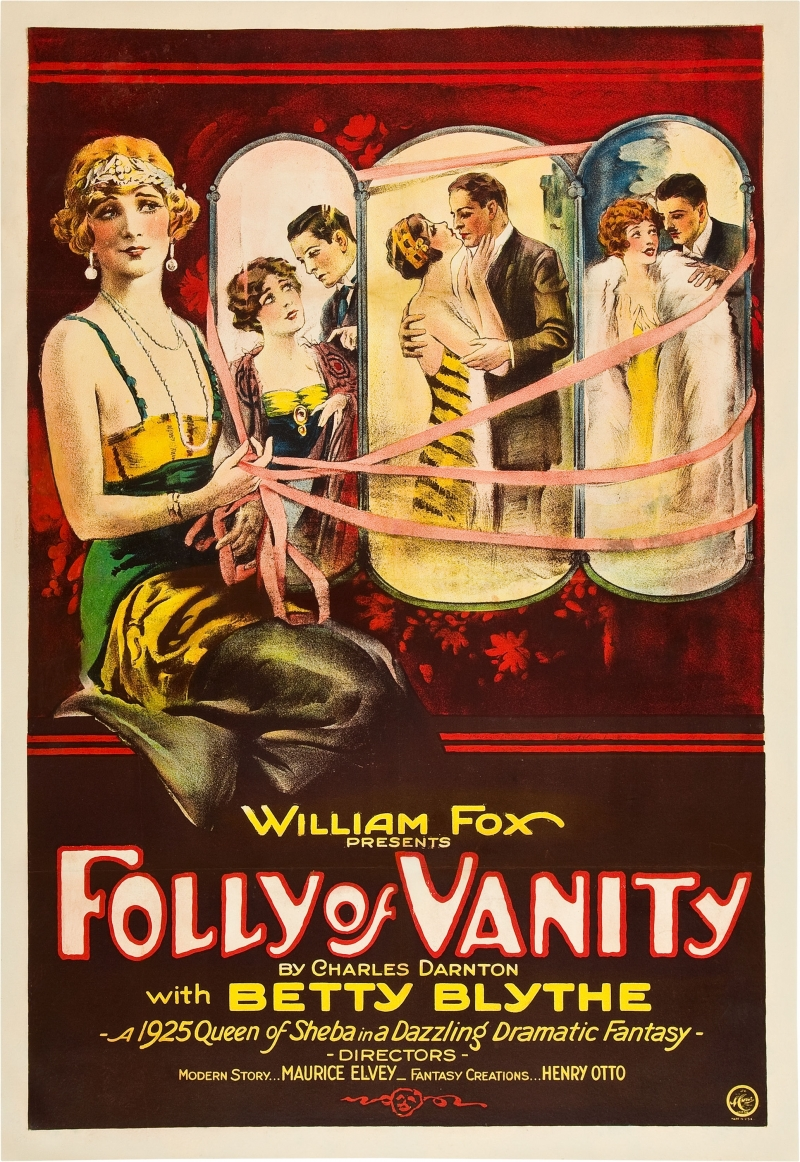
- Theatrical poster
- Directed by: Maurice Elvey; Henry Otto
- Written by: Edfrid Bingham (scenario)
- Story by: Charles Darnton
- Produced by: William Fox
- Starring: Billie Dove; Jack Mulhall; Betty Blythe
- Cinematography: G. O. Post; Joseph H. August; Joseph Valentine
- Production company: Fox Film Corporation
- Distributed by: Fox Film Corporation
- Release date: December 21, 1924
- Running time: 60 minutes
- Country: United States
- Language: Silent (English intertitles)

The Folly of Vanity is a 1924 American silent drama film codirected by Maurice Elvey and Henry Otto and starring Billie Dove and Betty Blythe. It was produced and distributed by the Fox Film Corporation. The film is divided into two sections, the modern part which was directed by Elvey and the underwater fantasy section directed by Otto.

== Plot ==
As described in a review in a film magazine, Alice, a beautiful young wife, loves jewelry and spends some money intended for other purposes to buy an imitation pearl necklace. Her husband Robert invites Ridgeway, a wealthy client, to dinner. Ridgeway is a conoisseur of women and pearls and invites the young couple to a party he is giving. Robert chides Alice for buying the pearls and declines the invitation but Alice, determined to go, gets her way. Ridgeway presents his guests with expensive jewelry as souvenirs and, unable to persuade Alice to take any, insists that she wear a beautiful pearl necklace to restore its lustre.

The whole crowd is invited on a yacht cruise where Ridgeway is attentive to Alice, while a wealthy widow attracts Robert. Alice and Robert have a quarrel. That night Alice dreams that Ridgeway is attempting to attack her. She jumps into the sea and is carried to Neptune's court where all wonders and beauties are shown her. Neptune is depicted as surrounded by beautiful maidens who are scantily clad or unclad. A festival is held in Alice's honor. A witch discovers that an imprint has been on her neck by the pearl necklace, a mark of vanity, and Neptune orders her cast out.

Awakening, Alice returns the necklace to Ridgeway, and by mistake enters Robert's room, where a reconciliation occurs.

== Cast ==
Modern part
- Billie Dove as Alice
- Jack Mulhall as Robert
- Betty Blythe as Bella Howard
- John St. Polis as Mr. Ridgeway
- Fred Becker as The Banker
- Otto Matiesen as Frenchman
- Byron Munson as Old Johnny
- Edna Mae Cooper as Russian Vamp
- Fonzie Gunn as Scandinavian Type
- Marcella Daly as French woman
- Lotus Thompson as Blond Gold Digger
- Al Mazzola (uncredited)

Fantasy part

- Consuelo as Thetis
- Jean La Motte as Lorelei
- Bob Klein as Neptune
- Ena Gregory as The Siren
- Lola Drovnar as The Witch
- Paul Weigel as Old roué

== Production ==
Portions of the dream fantasy sequence were tinted in various shades, some to indicate being underwater.

== Preservation ==
A print of The Folly of Vanity reportedly is held in the Národní filmový archiv and in an American collection.
