= The Last Edition =

1925 film

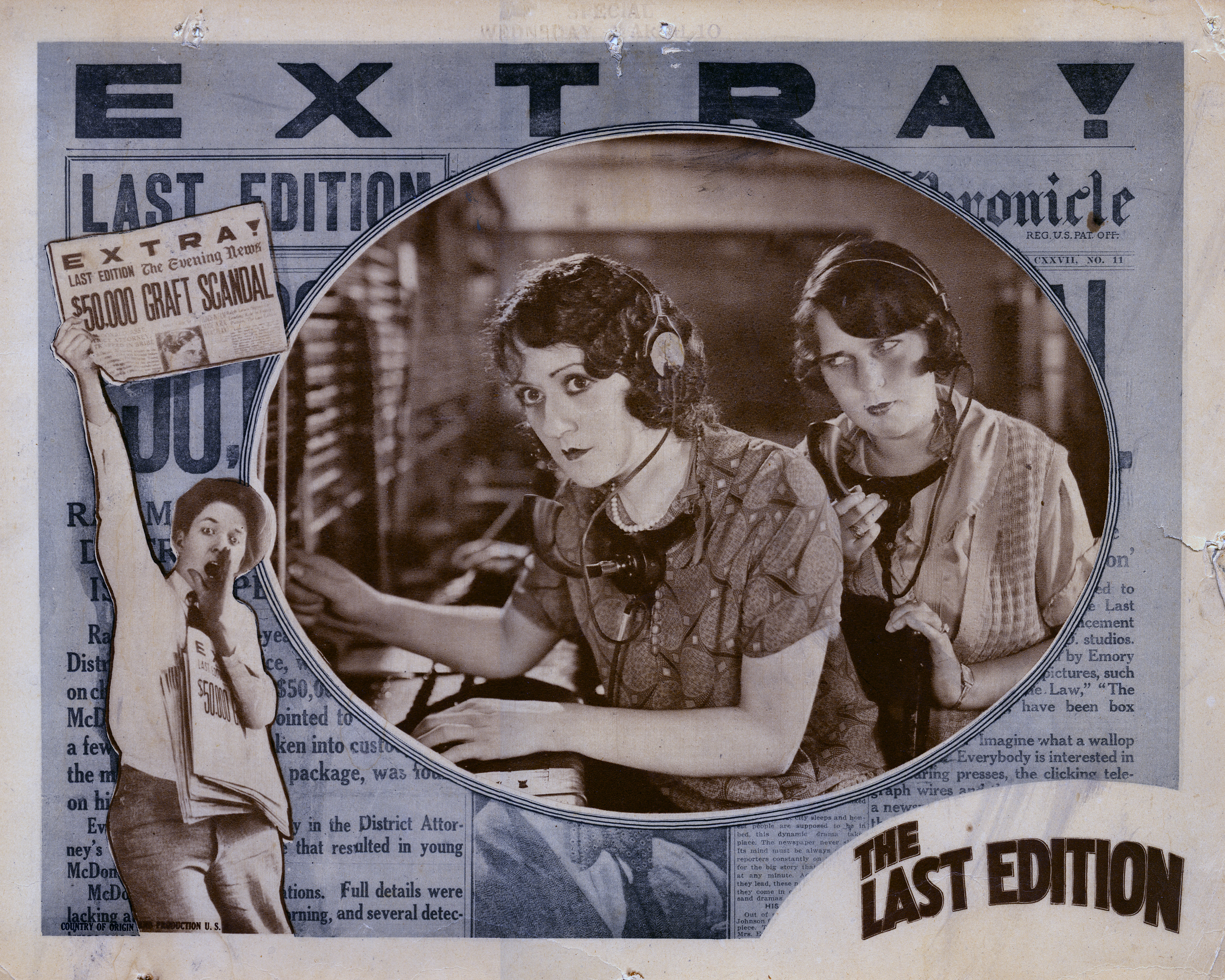
- Last Edition Lobby Card
- Directed by: Emory Johnson
- Written by: Emilie Johnson (story and screenplay)
- Produced by: Emory Johnson Productions
- Starring: Ralph Lewis
- Cinematography: Gilbert Warrenton
- Distributed by: Film Booking Offices of America
- Release date: November 8, 1925
- Running time: 7 reels
- Country: United States
- Languages: Silent; English intertitles

The Last Edition is a 1925 American silent melodrama directed by Emory Johnson. FBO released the film in November 1925. The film's "All-Star" cast included Ralph Lewis as a press man at the San Francisco Chronicle newspaper. Emilie Johnson, Johnson's mother, wrote both the story and screenplay. The Last Edition was the seventh film in Johnson's eight-picture contract with FBO.

== Plot ==
The Last Edition (1925)

The story starts by introducing us to Tom McDonald, a pressman and the assistant foreman in the San Francisco Chronicle pressroom. Tom finds out he was passed over for the job of press foreman. The job was given to a younger man. Though disappointed, he takes solace in knowing his son Ray McDonald has a good job in the district attorney's office. Tom also has a daughter – Polly.

Clarence Walker a reporter for The Chronicle works in the same building as Tom. Clarence secretly admires Polly McDonald. Currently, Clarence is also working on a hot story about a gang of bootleggers. The bootleggers feel Clarence is getting too close to their operations. They devise a plan to throw Clarence off their track. They create a news diversion by setting up another hot story for Clarence to follow. They frame prominent attorney Ray McDonald on a bribery charge.

Clarence jumps on the new lead, investigates the accusations, and quickly files his bribery story at the front desk of The Chronicle. Clarence's account is deemed a headliner for the newspaper. When the editor checks, they find out there is just enough time for Clarence's bribery story to make the newspaper's last edition. Just as the story is about to hit the presses, Tom McDonald finds out the evening's headline is about his son Ray. After reading the article, Tom knows in his heart that Ray could not be guilty of any bribery charge. Tom becomes enraged and attempts to destroy the press.

Tom's attempted destruction fails. During this time, the entire Chronicle plant burns to the ground. Tom is blamed for the fire. He is immediately thrown in jail, coincidentally in the same cell as his son.

Clarence believes Tom when he says his son is innocent. Clarence teams up with Polly to investigate the circumstances surrounding the bribery charge. After working together, they uncover evidence exonerating both father and son. A new plant is constructed; Tom is promoted to foreperson; Clarence marries Polly.

== Cast ==
| Actor | Role |
|---|---|
| Ralph Lewis | Tom McDonald |
| Lila Leslie | Mary McDonald |
| Ray Hallor | Ray McDonald |
| Frances Teague | Polly McDonald |
| Rex Lease | Clarence Walker |
| Lou Payne | George Hamilton |
| David Kirby | Red Moran |
| Wade Boteler | Mike Fitzgerald |
| Cuyler Supplee | Gerald Fuller |
| Lee Willard | Aaron Hoffman |
| Will Frank | Sam Blotz |
| Ada Mae Vaughn | Stenographer |
| Billy Bakewell | "Ink" Donovan |
| John Bailey | Jim Lannigan |
| Joseph Campbell | William Wilson |
| Daniel J. O'Brien | Chief of Police |
| Tom O'Brien | "Bull" Collins |
| C. Hollister Walker | Harry Owens |

== Production ==
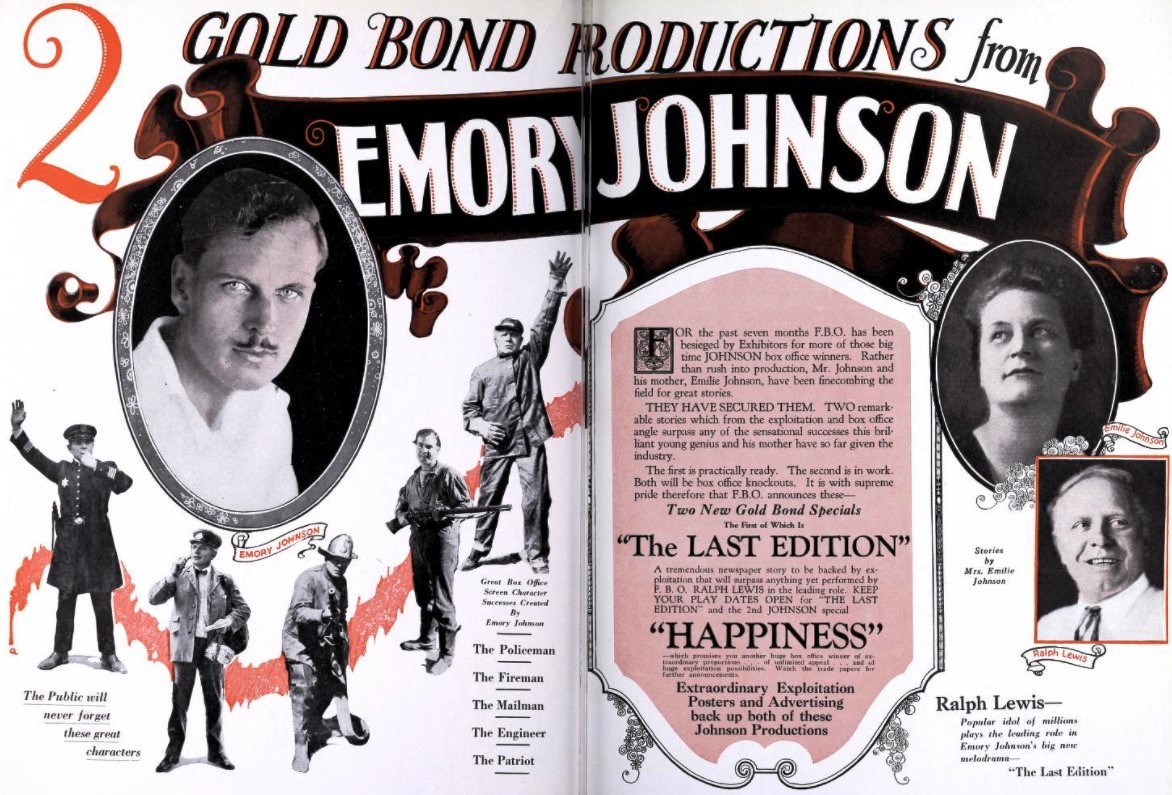
Advertisement in Exhibitors Herald

The motion picture was filmed in and around the "Old Chronicle Building" located at 690 Market Street in downtown San Francisco. However, in 1924, The Chronicle commissioned a new headquarters at 901 Mission Street on the corner of 5th Street. The Chronicle completed the move in 1925, shortly after the film crews were finished shooting. It was also filmed around Cosmo Street close to Hollywood Boulevard.

== Restoration ==
At one time, it was believed no copies of this film had survived. In 2011, Rob Byrne, a Bay Area film preservationist, discovered a surviving copy of the film in the archives of the EYE Film Institute in the Netherlands.

The nitrate film was restored in 2013 by the EYE Film Institute and the San Francisco Silent Film Festival to create two new 35mm exhibition prints. One copy was made available to the EYE Film Institute and the other to the U.S. Library of Congress. The intertitles for the discovered copy were in Dutch and were translated back to the original English.

== Gallery ==
Cast Members and Director
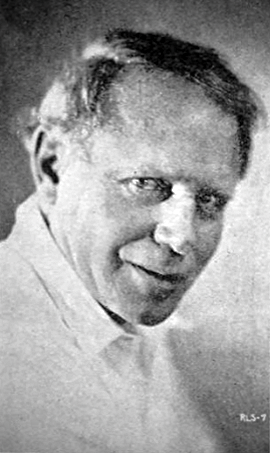
Ralph Lewis
Tom McDonald

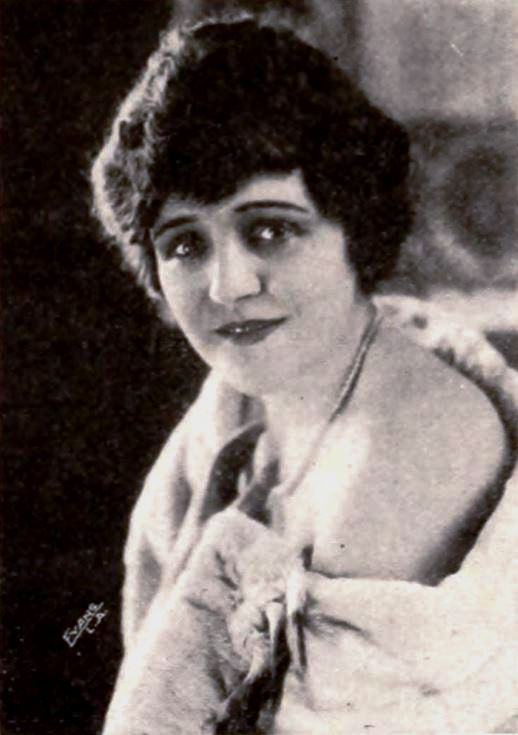
Lila Leslie
Mary McDonald

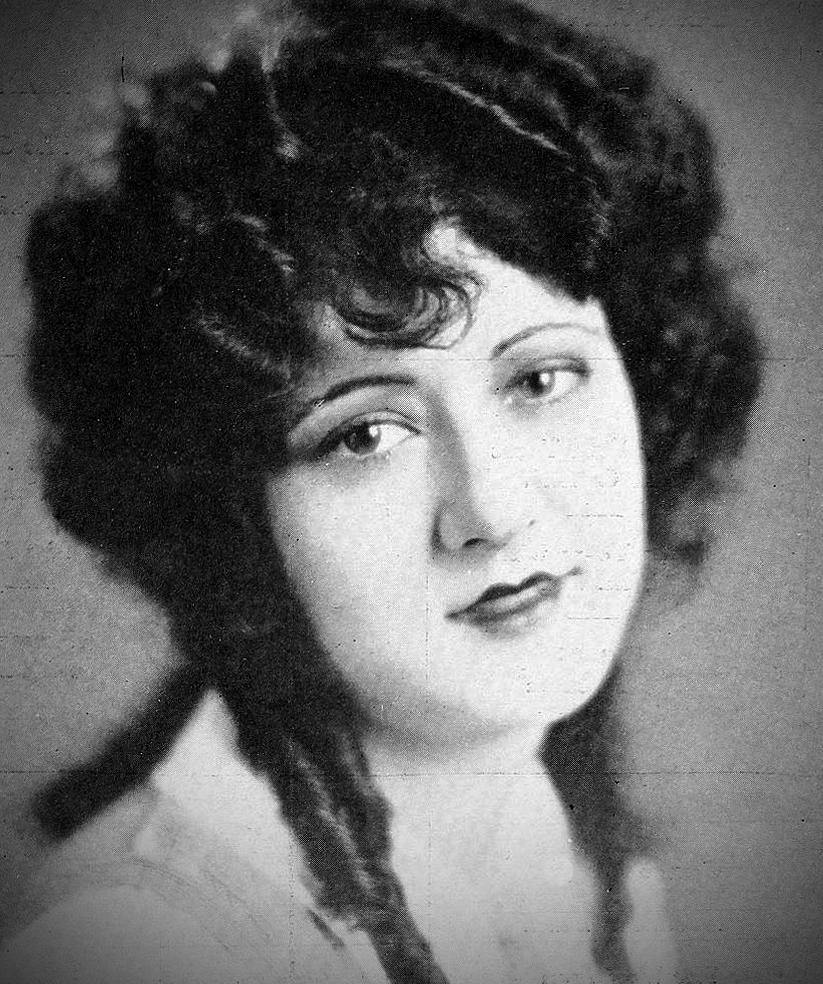
Frances Teague
Polly McDonald

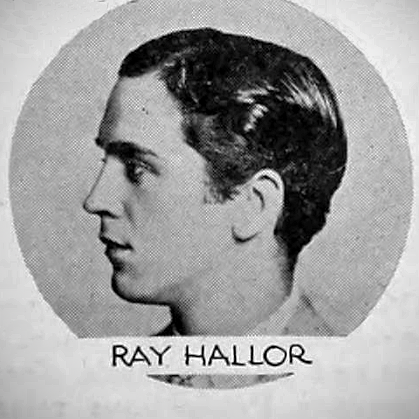
Ray Hallor
Ray McDonald

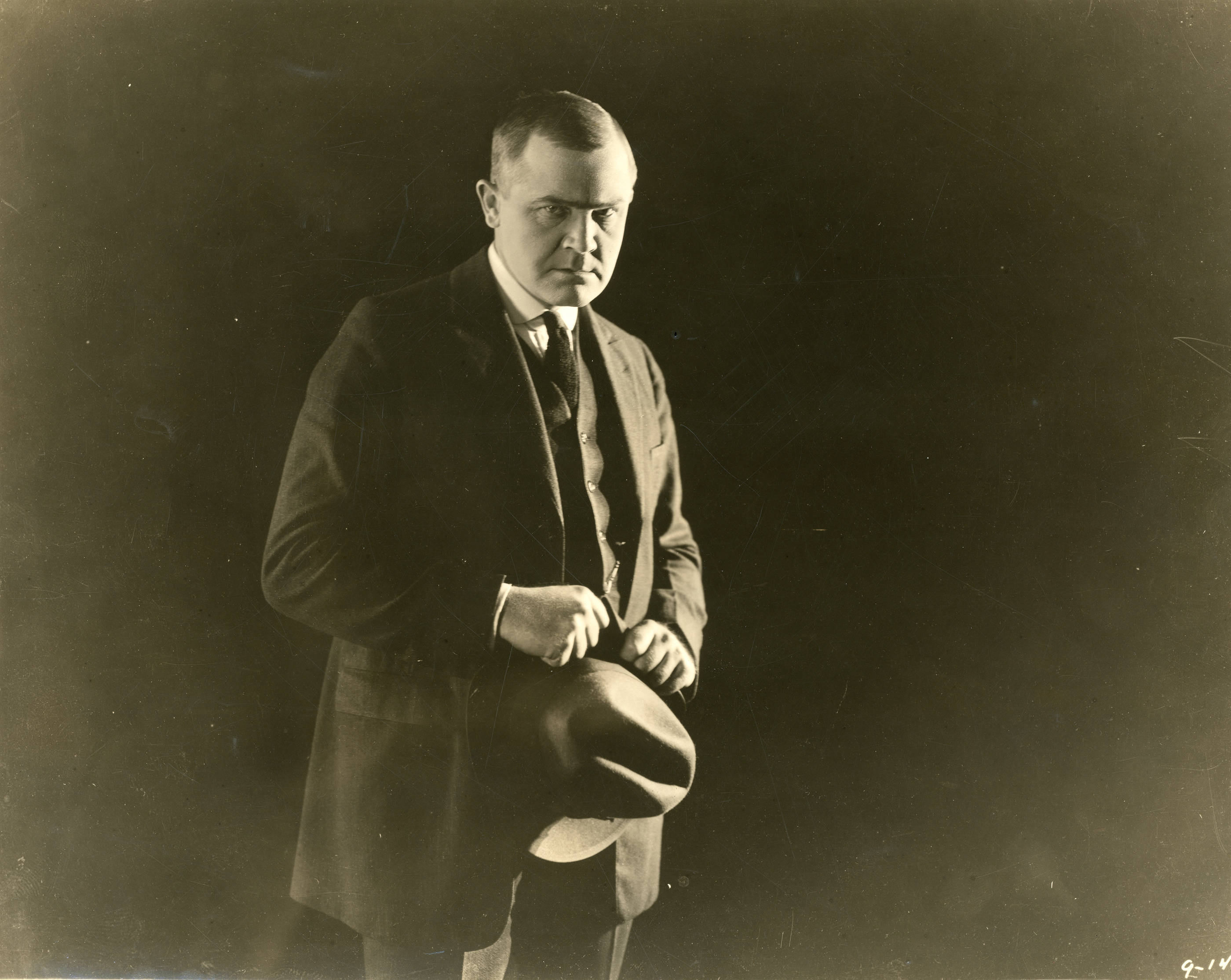
Wade Boteler
Mike Fitzgerald

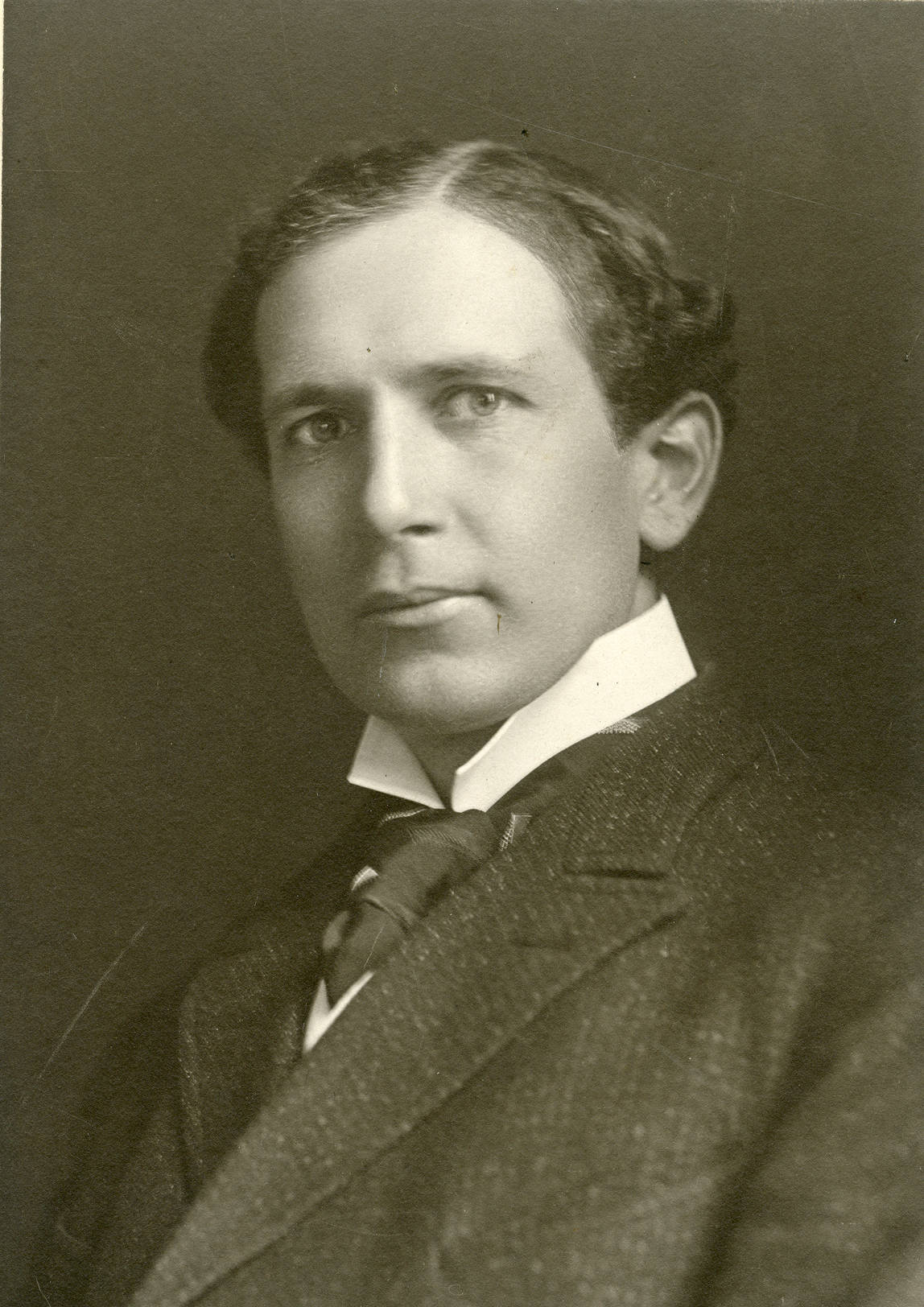
Asa Lee Willard
Aaron Hoffman

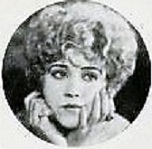
Ada Mae Vaughn
Stenographer

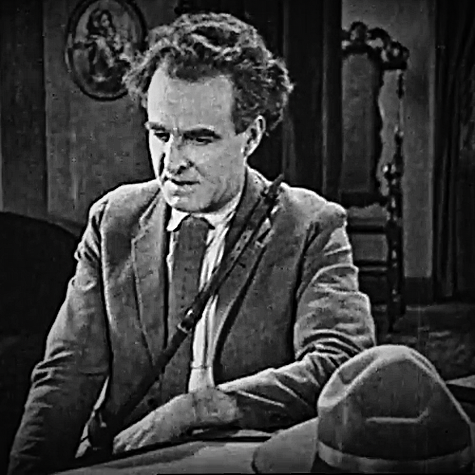
David Kirby
Red Moran

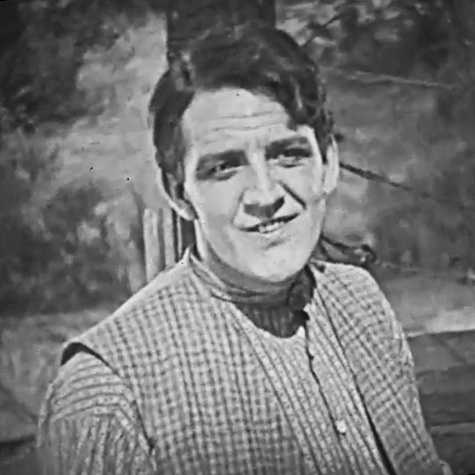
Cuyler Supplee
Gerald Fuller

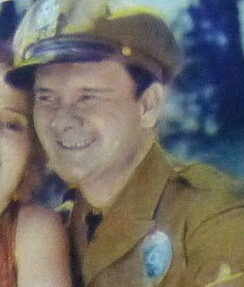
Rex Lease
Clarence Walker

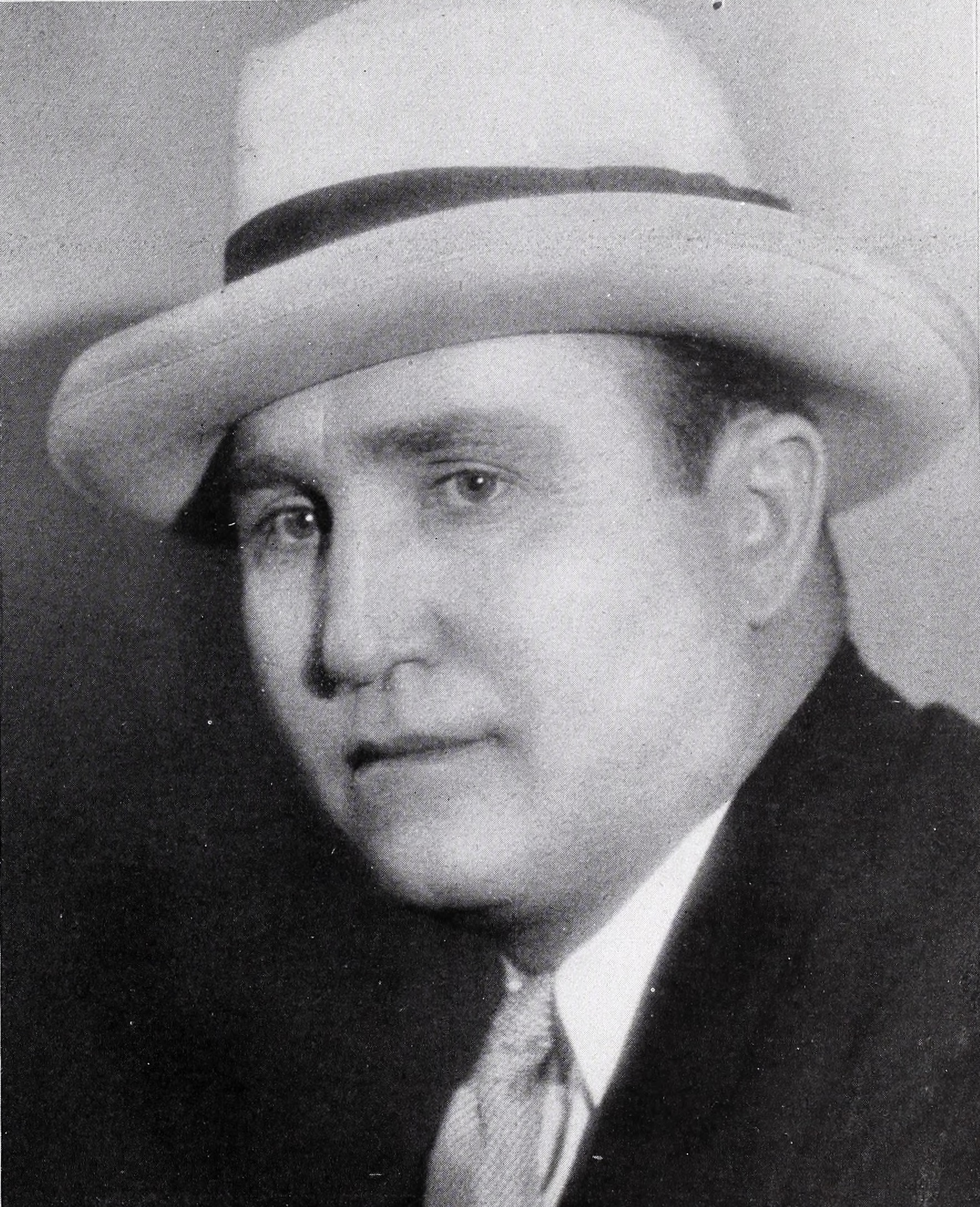
Tom O'Brien
"Bull" Collins

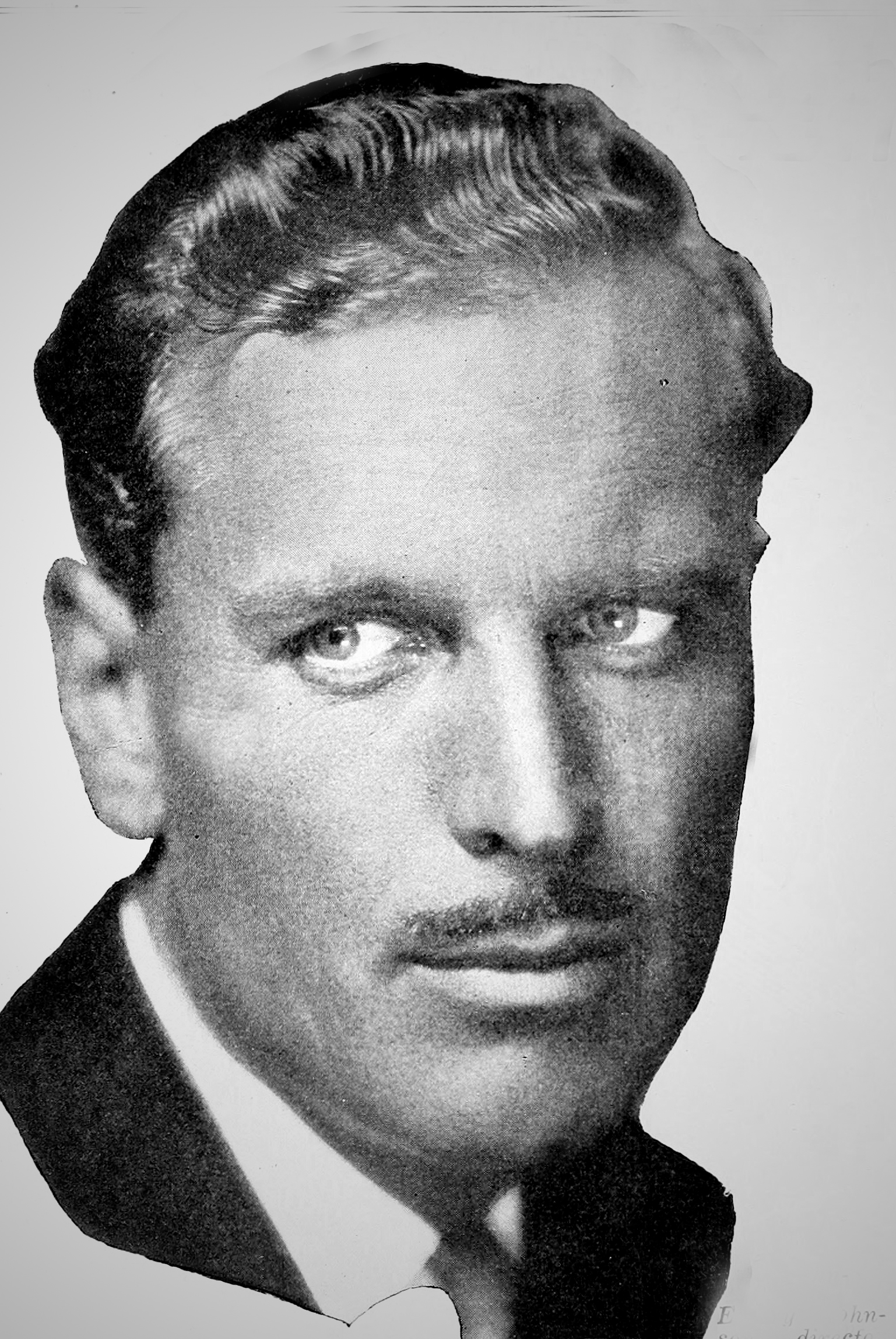
Emory Johnson
Director

== See also ==
- List of rediscovered films
