= Adamae Vaughn =

American actress (1905–1943)

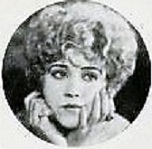
- Adamae Vaughn in 1927
- Born: Ada mae Vaughn; November 8, 1905; Ashland, Kentucky, U.S.
- Died: September 11, 1943 (aged 37); Studio City, California, U.S.
- Resting place: Forest Lawn Memorial Park, Glendale
- Occupation: Actress
- Years active: 1921–1936
- Spouses: Albert R. Hindman (m. 1926; div. 1927) Joseph Valentine Roul Fleur D'Anvray (m. 1934; div. 1940)
- Relatives: Alberta Vaughn (sister)

Adamae Vaughn (November 8, 1905 – September 11, 1943), also billed as Ada Mae Vaughn, was an American actress.

== Early years ==
Her sister was film actress Alberta Vaughn. Adamae was at first Alberta's manager and chaperone. When the studio needed a brunette, Adamae, a blonde, sent her sister.

== Actress ==
Vaughn was named a WAMPAS Baby Star of 1927. She was in nine movies between 1921 and 1936, including The Courtship of Miles Standish (1923) and The Last Edition (1925). Dancing Sweeties (1930) was produced by First National Pictures and Vitaphone and featured Sue Carol and Grant Withers. Vaughn played Emma O'Neil.

In September 1929, she appeared in the Warner Bros. revue The Show of Shows in a musical number featuring sisters who were actresses. Together with Alberta, she was featured with Dolores Costello, Helene Costello, Shirley Mason, Viola Dana, Loretta Young, Sally Blane, and others.

== Marriage ==
She married Albert R. Hindman, a Los Angeles businessman, in May 1926. They divorced in October 1927. A reconciliation scheduled for early 1928 was cancelled.

In June 1934, Vaughn wed Hollywood automobile executive Joseph Valentine Roul Fleur D'Anvray (also known as Viscount D'Anvray), who came from a noble family in Anvray, France. He was a French author and a representative of General Motors in Europe. After their marriage, Vaughn accompanied her husband to live in France. They divorced in October 1940.

== Death ==
In April 1937, Vaughn underwent abdominal surgery, which left her with multiple adhesions. Complications from this operation eventually landed her in the Hollywood Hospital located in Studio City, California. Vaughn died on September 11, 1943, from an intestinal blockage.

== Filmography ==
Name	Released	Role	Credit	Genre
Stop Kidding	1921	Evelyn Marlowe	Yes	Comedy
The Courtship of Miles Standish	1923	Unk	Yes	Drama
The Last Edition	1925	Hamilton's Stenographer	Yes	Melodrama
The Arizona Streak	1926	Ruth Castleman	Yes	Western
Flashing Fangs	1926	June	Yes	Melodrama
Show of Shows	1929	Performer in 'Meet My Sister' Number	Yes	Musical
Dancing Sweeties	1930	Emma O'Neil	Yes	Romantic Comedy
The Notorious Sophie Lang	1934	Bystander	uncredited	Crime Drama
Love Before Breakfast	1936	College Girl	uncredited	Romantic Comedy
