= The Port of Missing Girls =

1928 film

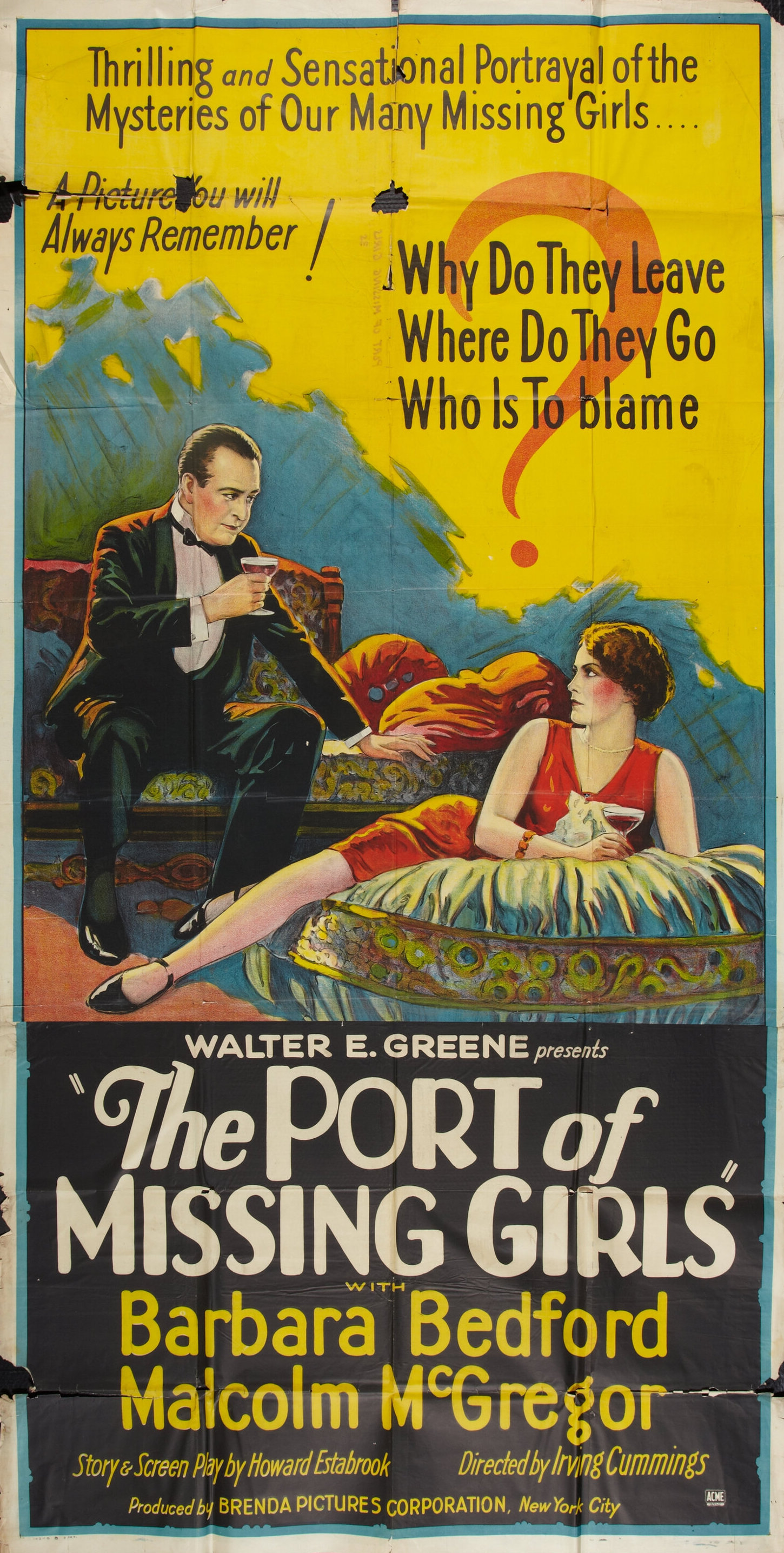
- Film poster
- Directed by: Irving Cummings
- Written by: Howard Estabrook (story & scenario); Viola Brothers Shore (intertitles)
- Produced by: Brenda Pictures Corporation
- Starring: Barbara Bedford; Hedda Hopper; Malcolm McGregor
- Cinematography: Charles Van Enger
- Edited by: George Nichols Jr.
- Distributed by: Brenda Pictures Corporation and or Columbia Pictures
- Release date: March 1928
- Running time: 8 reels; (7,250 feet)
- Country: United States
- Language: Silent (English intertitles)

The Port of Missing Girls is a 1928 American silent drama film directed by Irving Cummings. It stars Barbara Bedford and Hedda Hopper, making it one of the rare occasions when Hopper actually starred in a film.

== Cast ==
- Barbara Bedford as Ruth King
- Malcolm McGregor as Buddie Larkins
- Natalie Kingston as Catherine King
- Hedda Hopper as Mrs. C. King
- George Irving as Cyrus King
- Wyndham Standing as Mayor McKibben
- Charles K. Gerrard as DeLeon (credited as Charles Gerrard)
- Paul Nicholson as George Hamilton
- Edith Yorke as Mrs. Blane
- Bodil Rosing as Elsa
- Rosemary Theby as School Matron
- Lotus Thompson as Anne
- Amber Norman as Marjorie

== Reception ==
In the July 31, 1928 issue of the New York Daily News, the newspaper's film critic Irene Thirer began grading movies on a scale of zero to three stars. "Three stars meant 'excellent,' two 'good,' and one star meant 'mediocre.' And no stars at all 'means the picture's right bad,'" wrote Thirer. The Port of Missing Girls received one star; Carl Bialik speculates that this may have been the first time a film critic used a star-rating system to grade movies.

== Censorship ==
When The Port of Missing Girls was released, many states and cities in the United States had censor boards that could require cuts or other eliminations before the film could be shown. The Kansas censor board ordered a cut of an intertitle that stated, "Is there anything else you like to do except dance?"

== Preservation ==
A print of The Port of Missing Girls is preserved in the Library of Congress.
