= The Arizona Streak =

1926 film

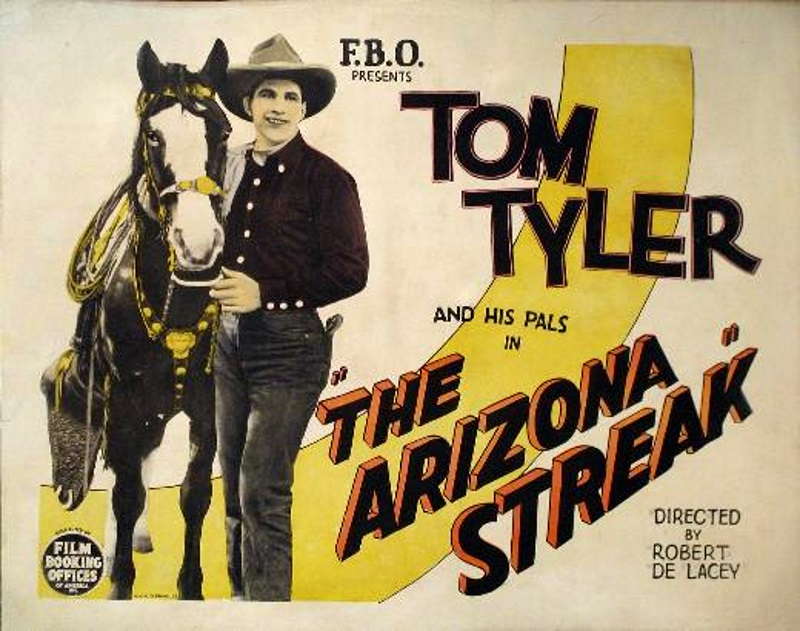
- Directed by: Robert De Lacey
- Written by: Lanier Bartlett; F.A.E. Pine
- Starring: Tom Tyler; Frankie Darro; Ada Mae Vaughn
- Cinematography: John W. Leezer
- Production company: Robertson-Cole Pictures Corporation
- Distributed by: Film Booking Offices of America
- Release date: March 7, 1926
- Running time: 5 reels
- Country: United States
- Language: Silent (English intertitles)

The Arizona Streak is a 1926 American silent Western film directed by Robert De Lacey and starring Tom Tyler, Frankie Darro, and Ada Mae Vaughn.

== Plot ==
As described in a film magazine review, Dandy Darrell wins the Bar C ranch from Rufus Castleman in a gambling game, who then dies. Dandy goes to claim the ranch and meets Smiling Morn, the grumpy old cook. Later Dandy whips Black Duff, the drunken foreman of the ranch. Ruth Castleman returns to claim the Bar C ranch as the rightful heiress and Dandy, infatuated with the young woman, does not let her know that the property is now his as a result of the game. Duff tells her Dandy caused her father's death. She fires Dandy, but he latter spoils Duff's plans to steal her cattle and saves Ruth from him. Dandy wins the affection of Ruth.

== Cast ==
- Tom Tyler as Dandy Carrell
- Alfred Hewston as Smiling Morn
- Ada Mae Vaughn as Ruth Castleman
- Frankie Darro as Mike
- Dave Ward as Denver
- LeRoy Mason as Velvet Hamilton
- Gunboat Smith as Jim
