= The Yellow Back =

1926 film directed by Del Andrews

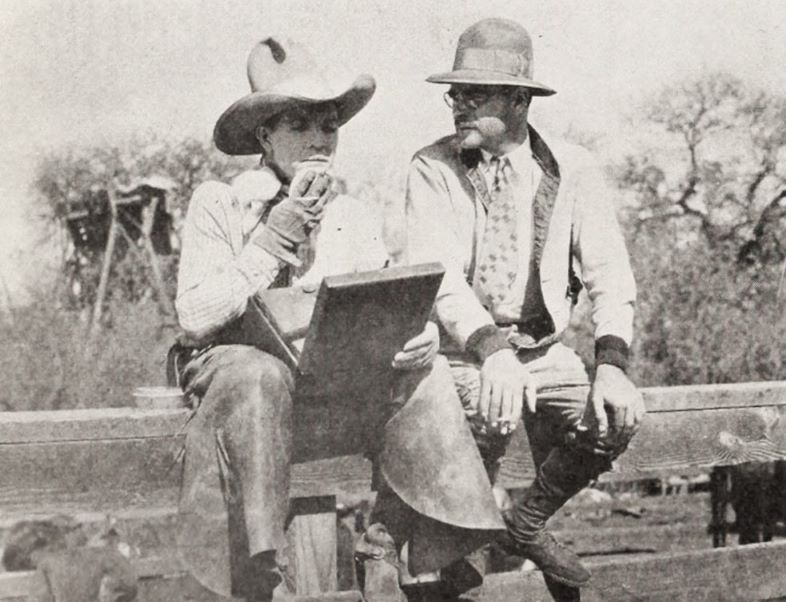
- Still with Fred Humes and director Del Andrews
- Directed by: Del Andrews
- Written by: Del Andrews
- Produced by: Carl Laemmle
- Starring: Fred Humes
- Cinematography: Al Jones
- Distributed by: Universal Pictures
- Release date: October 3, 1926
- Running time: 5 reels
- Country: United States
- Language: Silent (English intertitles)

The Yellow Back is a 1926 American silent Western film directed by Del Andrews and produced and distributed by Universal Pictures. It was marketed as a Blue Streak Western.

== Cast ==
- Fred Humes as Andy Hubbard
- Lotus Thompson as Anne Pendleton
- Claude Payton as Bruce Condon
- Buck Connors as John Pendleton
- Willie Fung as Chinese

== Preservation ==
A print of The Yellow Back is preserved in the Library of Congress collection.
