= Know Thy Child =

1921 film

- Directed by: Franklyn Barrett
- Written by: Elsie M. Cummins
- Produced by: Franklyn Barrett
- Cinematography: Franklyn Barrett
- Production company: Barrett's Australian Productions
- Release date: 8 October 1921
- Running time: 6 reels
- Country: Australia
- Languages: Silent film English intertitles

Know Thy Child is a 1921 Australian silent film directed by Franklyn Barrett.

It is considered a lost film.

== Plot ==
A travelling salesman, Ray Standford (Roland Conway), seduces country girl Sadie McClure (Vera James) but forgets about her when she returns to the city and marries Dorothy Graham (Nada Conrade), daughter of his boss. Sadie gives birth to a daughter, Eileen (Lotus Thompson), who becomes Ray's personal secretary. Dorothy becomes a social worker and she and Ray can not have children. Dorothy pressures the government to declare bigamous all marriages contracted by people who were "morally pledged" to others. Ray becomes attracted to Ellen, but she has a sweetheart, engineer Geoffrey Dexter. One night burglars enter a building containing Ray, Eileen and Geoffrey but they fight them off.

Sadie dies and Standford and Dorothy adopt the girl.

== Cast ==
- Roland Conway as Ray Standford
- Nada Conrade as Dorothy Graham
- Lotus Thompson as Eileen Baker
- Vera James as Sadie McClure
- Gerald Harcourt as Geoffrey Dexter
- Lily Rochefort

== Production ==
Filming was delayed for some time due to fear of the subject matter, involving illegitimate children, but this was overcome.

The film was shot in Sydney at the Rushcutters Bay Studio with exteriors done at Berowra Waters and at Grenwell Point near Nowra.

A contemporary report said it featured "probably the biggest set ever used in an Australian film." Filming was completed by July 1921.

This was the film debut of Lotus Thompson who later achieved fame in Hollywood.

Actress Wendy Osborne later claimed she refused a role in the film on moral grounds.

== Release ==
Barrett distributed the movie himself, but it was not a big success at the box office.

The film was seen by Sir Walter Davidson, the Governor of New South Wales, whose endorsement of the film was used prominently in advertising.

== See also ==
- List of lost films
