= 1934 in Australia =

- Decades: 1910s; 1920s; 1930s; 1940s; 1950s
- See also: 1934 in Australian literature; Other events of 1934; Federal election; Timeline of Australian history

The following lists events that happened during 1934 in Australia.

1934 in Australia
- Monarch: George V
- Governor-General: Isaac Isaacs
- Prime minister: Joseph Lyons
- Population: 6,677,361
- Elections: Federal, Tasmania

== Incumbents ==
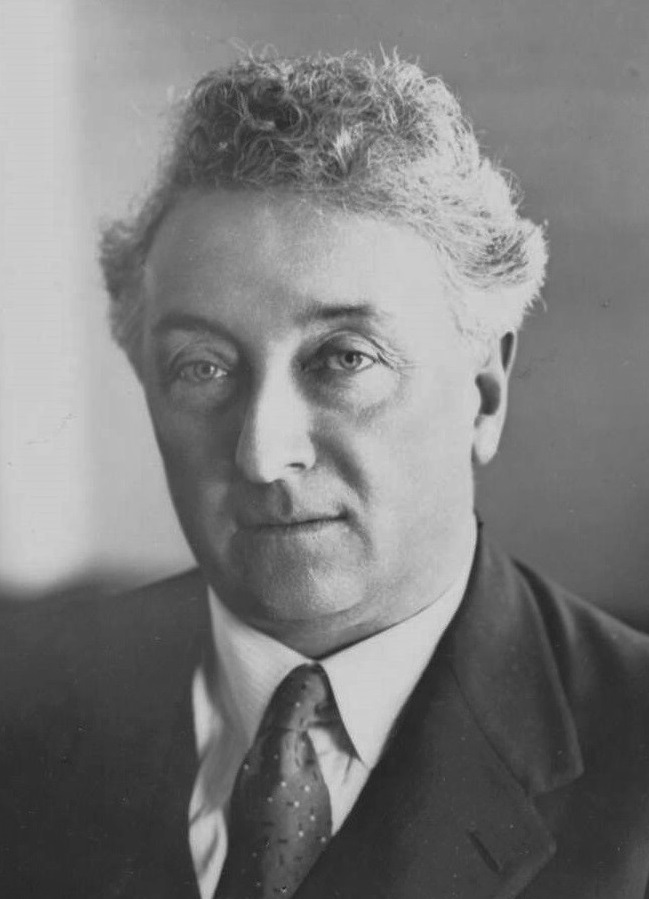
Joseph Lyons

- Monarch – George V
- Governor-General – Sir Isaac Isaacs
- Prime Minister – Joseph Lyons
- Chief Justice – Frank Gavan Duffy

=== State Premiers ===
- Premier of New South Wales – Bertram Stevens
- Premier of Queensland – William Forgan Smith
- Premier of South Australia – Richard L. Butler
- Premier of Tasmania – John McPhee (until 15 March), then Walter Lee (until 22 June), then Albert Ogilvie
- Premier of Victoria – Sir Stanley Argyle
- Premier of Western Australia – Philip Collier

=== State Governors ===
- Governor of New South Wales – Sir Philip Game
- Governor of Queensland – Sir Leslie Orme Wilson
- Governor of South Australia – Sir Alexander Hore-Ruthven (until 26 April), then Sir Winston Dugan (from 20 July)
- Governor of Tasmania – Sir Ernest Clark
- Governor of Victoria – William Vanneck, 5th Baron Huntingfield (from 14 May)
- Governor of Western Australia – none appointed

== Events ==
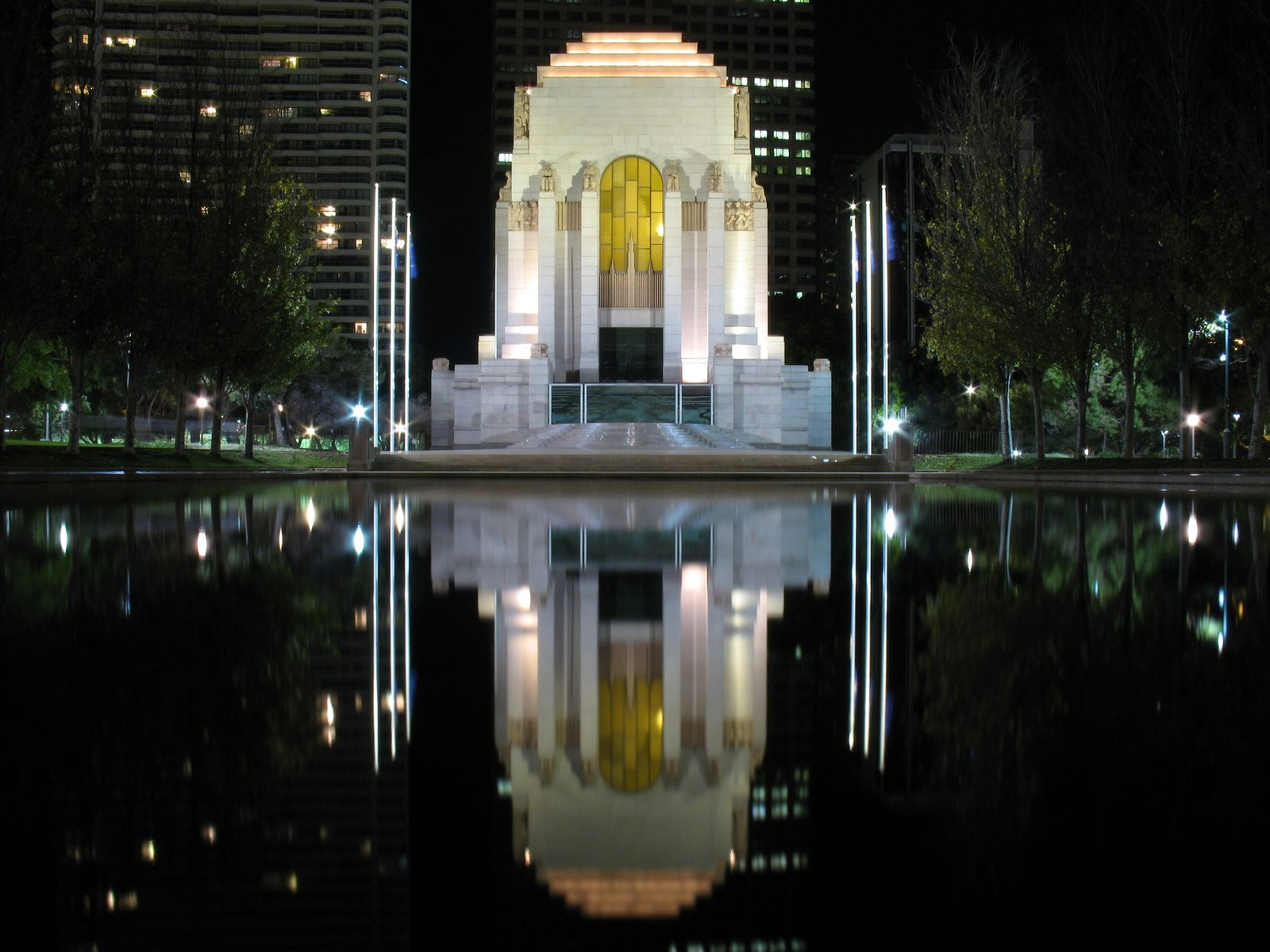
ANZAC War Memorial Sydney, built in 1934

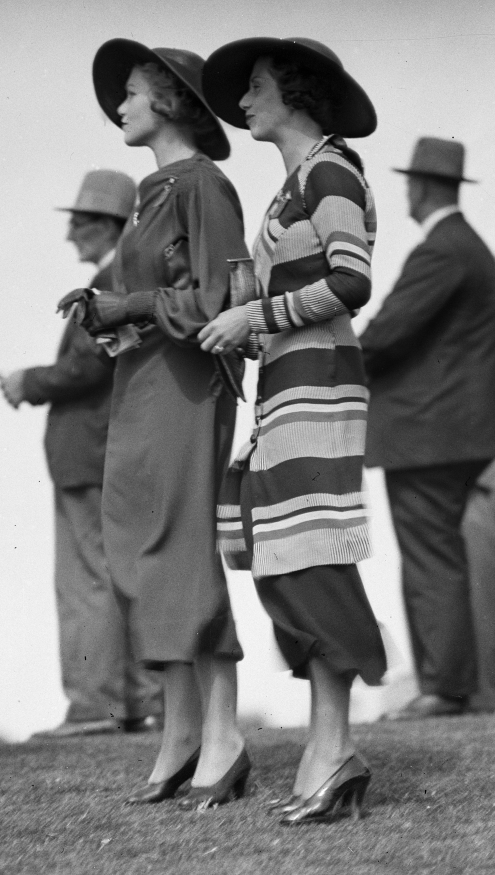
Two fashionably-dressed women at the Warwick Farm Racecourse in Australia, 1934.

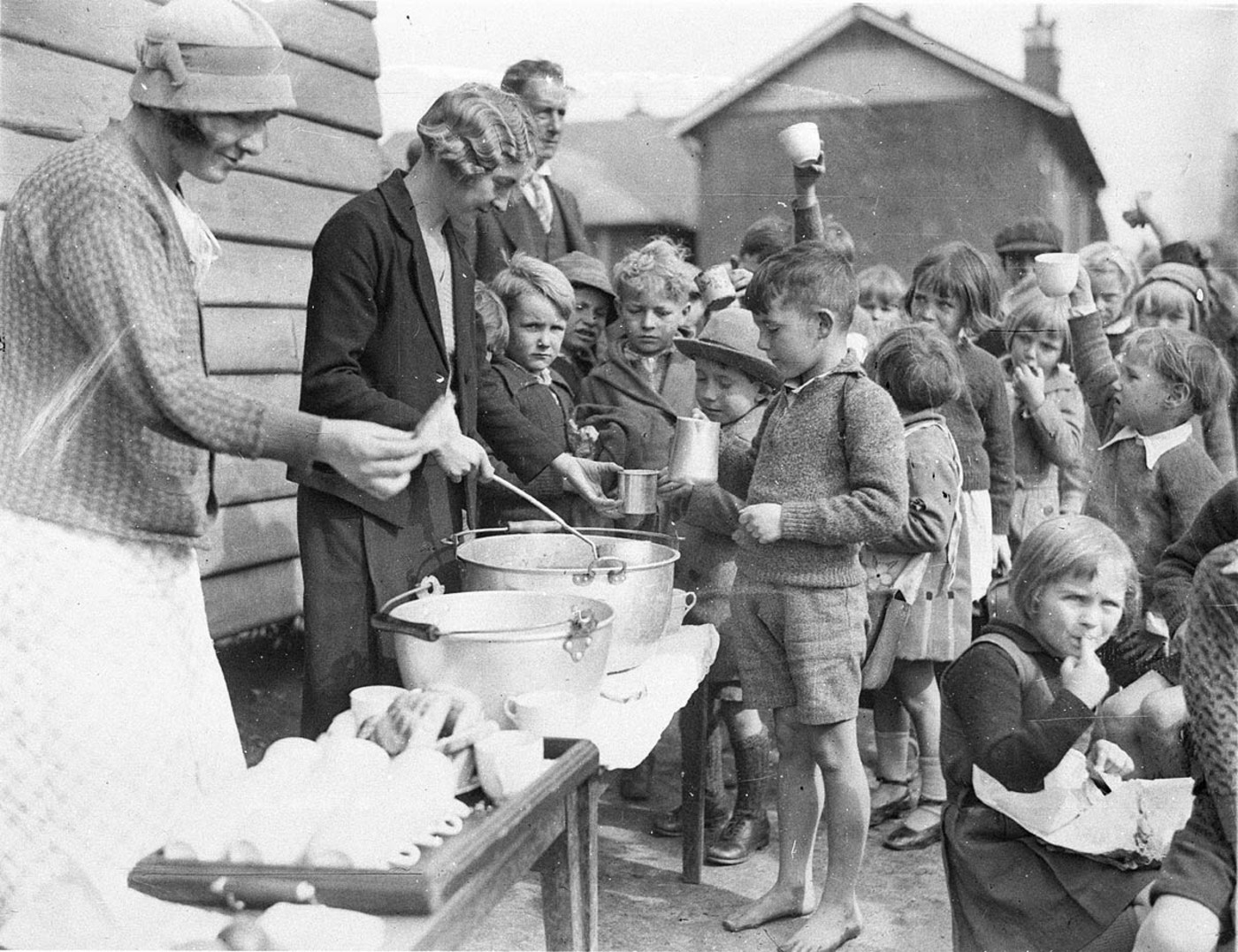
Schoolchildren line up for free issue of soup and a slice of bread in the Depression, Belmore North Public School, Sydney, 2 August 1934 (photographed by Sam Hood)

- 18 January – Qantas and Imperial Airways join forces and establish Qantas Empire Airways.
- 12 March – An intense cyclone crosses the Queensland coast near Innisfail, 75 people were confirmed dead.
- 21 March to 14 June – The Australian Eastern Mission, led by deputy prime minister John Latham, visited a number of countries in East Asia and South-East Asia, the first Australian diplomatic mission outside the British Empire.
- June – During the Great Depression, Frank W. Davey opens his auto-electrical repairs business in a small shop in Carlton, Victoria, Australia with a staff of five. Recognising a market niche during poor economic times, Mr Davey expands his humble business into an electric motor and generator manufacturer and finally the manufacturer of Australia’s own world famous, iconic Davey Water brand.
- 1 September – Body of the "Pyjama Girl" found in Albury, New South Wales.
- 15 September – A federal election is held. Joseph Lyons is returned as Prime Minister, leading a United Australia Party-Country Party coalition to victory over the Australian Labor Party.
- 3 October – Qantas de Havilland DH.50 Atalanta, registration VH-UHE, crashes near Winton, Queensland, killing the pilot and 2 passengers.
- 15 October – Captain Cook's cottage is opened to the public, after being dismantled in England, then shipped to Australia and reassembled in Fitzroy Gardens, Melbourne.
- 18 October – Charles Prince of Morphettville is found guilty of fraud for the "ring in" of Redlock at the Murray Bridge Racing Club on 28 July.
- 24 October – Charles William Anderson Scott and Tom Campbell Black cross the finishing line and win the MacRobertson Air Race, flying from London to Melbourne in an elapsed time of 71 hours.
- 6 November – The Australian government attempts to stop left-wing writer Egon Erwin Kisch from entering the country, using the language provisions of the Immigration Restriction Act 1901 which allowed a test in any European language. The multi-lingual Kisch was tested in Scottish Gaelic, although the decision to block his entry was later overturned by the High Court.
- 11 November – The Shrine of Remembrance in Melbourne is dedicated.
- 15 November – Qantas de Havilland DH86 crashes after departing from Longreach Airport during its delivery flight.

=== Unknown dates ===
- The first ute is produced by Ford in Geelong
- CMV Group founded

== Arts and literature ==
- Henry Hanke wins the Archibald Prize with his self-portrait
- Eleanor Dark's Prelude to Christopher is published. The author was later awarded the ALS Gold Medal.
- Martin Boyd publishes his first novel Scandal of Spring
- Christina Stead publishes her first novel Seven Poor Men of Sydney

== Film ==
- Strike Me Lucky, starring Roy Rene and directed by Ken G. Hall, is released

== Sport ==
- 8 September - The 1934 NSWRFL season culminates in Western Suburbs' 15–12 victory against Eastern Suburbs in the final. University finish in last place, claiming the wooden spoon.
- Peter Pan wins the Melbourne Cup
- Victoria wins the Sheffield Shield
- Australia defeats England 2–1 in The Ashes series, held in England

== Births ==
- 6 January – Harry M. Miller, promoter and publicist (died 2018)
- 11 January – Peter Badcoe, soldier and Victoria Cross recipient (died 1967)
- 20 January – Barry Fisher, cricketer (died 1980)
- 26 January – Ruby Langford Ginibi, Indigenous author and historian (died 2011)
- 31 January – Gil Jamieson, painter (died 1992)
- 6 February – Hugh Cornish, media personality (died 2024)
- 15 February – Graham Kennedy, entertainer (died 2005)
- 17 February – Barry Humphries, entertainer (died 2023)
- 24 February – Frank Brazier, Olympic cyclist (died 2021)
- 20 March – David Malouf, writer (died 2026)
- 31 March – Stewart West, politician (died 2023)
- 16 April
  - Robert Stigwood, impresario and film producer (died 2016)
  - Barrie Unsworth, Premier of New South Wales
- 17 April – Sir Peter Morris, surgeon (died 2022)
- 27 April – Colin Holt, Australian rules footballer (died 2018)
- 1 May – John Meillon, actor (died 1989)
- 5 May – Victor Garland, politician and high commissioner to the UK (died 2022)
- 6 May – Chris Wallace-Crabbe, poet and academic (died 2025)
- 20 May – Gerald Ridsdale, sex offender and defrocked priest (died 2025)
- 2 June – Ian Brooker, botanist (died 2016)
- 27 June – Bill Hay, Australian rules footballer (died 2018)
- 6 July – Tony Burreket, politician (died 2016)
- 7 July – Brian Davis, politician (died 2018)
- 11 July – Barney Cooney, politician (died 2019)
- 16 July – Marjorie McQuade, swimmer (died 1997)
- 18 July – Alan Ridge, politician (died 2026)
- 12 August – Ian George, Anglican Archbishop of Adelaide (1991–2004)(died 2019)
- 17 August – Ben Humphreys, politician (died 2019)
- 25 August – Jimmy Hannan, television presenter (died 2019)
- 14 September – Bob Maguire, Roman Catholic priest and media personality (died 2023)
- 15 September – Fred Nile, clergyman and politician (died 2026)
- 29 September – Alan Hopgood, actor and writer (died 2022)
- 7 October – Howard Olney, judge and Western Australian politician (died 2025)
- 9 October – Jill Ker Conway, author and academic (died 2018)
- 10 October – Julian Beale, politician (died 2021)
- 19 October – Des Hoare, cricketer
- 24 October – Margie Masters, golfer (died 2022)
- 2 November – Ken Rosewall, tennis player
- 16 November – Peter Ross Sinclair, Governor of New South Wales (1990–1996)
- 21 November – Peter Philpott, cricketer (died 2021)
- 4 December – Bill Collins, film critic (died 2019)
- 24 December – Alan Beaumont, Chief of the Australian Defence Force (1993–1995), (died 2004)

== Deaths ==
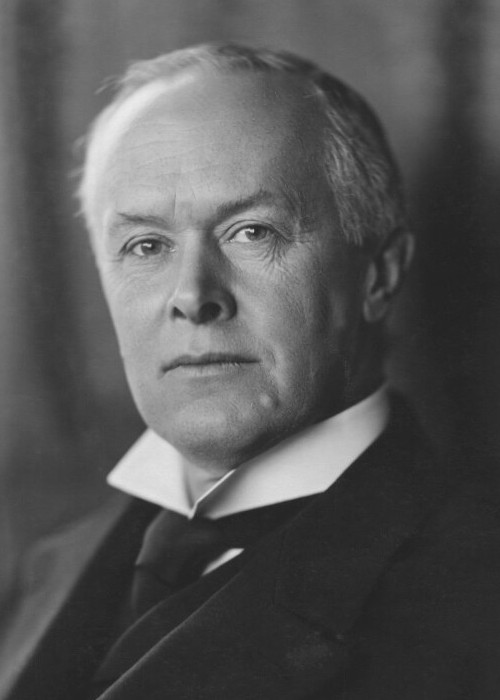
Ronald Munro Ferguson, 1st Viscount Novar

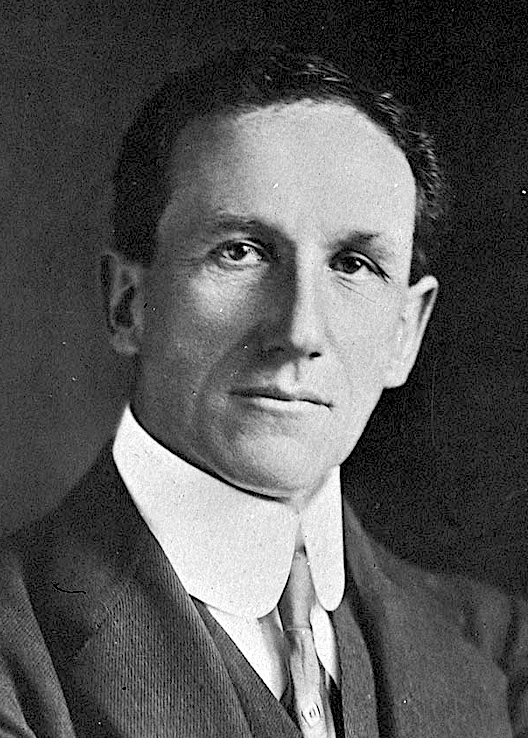
William Holman

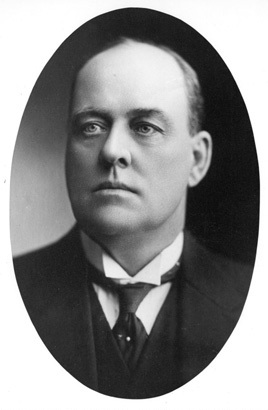
John Scaddan

- 1 January – Sir Robert Gibson, businessman (born in the United Kingdom) (b. 1863)
- 14 January – Staniforth Smith, Western Australian politician (b. 1869)
- 22 January – Arthur Jose, historian (born in the United Kingdom) (b. 1863)
- 30 January – Edward Heitmann, Western Australian politician (b. 1878)
- 21 February – Sydney Smith, New South Wales politician (b. 1856)
- 27 February – George Temple-Poole, architect and public servant (born in Italy) (b. 1856)
- 17 March – Walter Rosenhain, metallurgist (born in Germany and died in the United Kingdom) (b. 1875)
- 23 March – Thomas Brown, New South Wales politician (b. 1861)
- 29 March – Sir Josiah Symon, South Australian politician (born in the United Kingdom) (b. 1846)
- 30 March – Ronald Munro Ferguson, 1st Viscount Novar, 6th Governor-General of Australia (born and died in the United Kingdom) (b. 1860)
- 12 April – Bertram Steele, scientist (born in the United Kingdom) (b. 1870)
- 12 May – Agar Wynne, Victorian politician (born in the United Kingdom) (b. 1850)
- 25 May – Percy Coleman, New South Wales politician and union organiser (b. 1892)
- 5 June - Emily Dobson, philanthropist (b. 1842)
- 6 June – William Holman, 19th Premier of New South Wales (born in the United Kingdom) (b. 1871)
- 19 June – John McDonald, Western Australian politician (b. 1869)
- 30 June – David Charleston, South Australian politician (born in the United Kingdom) (b. 1848)
- 14 July – John Thomson, New South Wales politician (b. 1862)
- 31 July – Charles McGrath, Victorian politician (b. 1872)
- 6 August – Alexander Leeper, educationist (born in Ireland) (b. 1848)
- 18 August – Sir John Sulman, architect (born in the United Kingdom) (b. 1949)
- 27 August – Linda Agostini, murder victim (born in the United Kingdom) (b. 1905)
- 28 August – Sir Edgeworth David, geologist and explorer (born in the United Kingdom) (b. 1858)
- 5 September – Sidney Myer, businessman and philanthropist (born in Belarus) (b. 1878)
- 10 September – Fred Bamford, Queensland politician (b. 1849)
- 7 October – William Sutherland Dun, palaeontologist and geologist (born in the United Kingdom) (b. 1868)
- 16 October – James Mathews, Victorian politician (b. 1865)
- 21 November – John Scaddan, 10th Premier of Western Australia (b. 1876)
- 3 December – Charles Ulm, aviator (died in the Pacific Ocean) (b. 1898)

== See also ==
- List of Australian films of the 1930s
