= List of Australian films of the 1930s =

This is a list of Australian films of the 1930s. For a complete alphabetical list, see Category:Australian films.

== 1930s ==
Title	Director	Cast	Genre	Notes
1930
The Cheaters	Paulette McDonagh		Drama	IMDb
Southward Ho with Mawson	Frank Hurley		Documentary	
Tiger Island				
1931
A Co-respondent's Course				
Diggers	Pat Hanna			
Haunted Barn				
Isle of Intrigue				
Showgirl's Luck				
Siege of the South				
Spur of the Moment				
1932
His Royal Highness				
On Our Selection				
The Sentimental Bloke				
Symphony in Steel				
1933
Annette Kellerman Returns to Australia			Short	IMDb
Diggers in Blighty	Pat Hanna			
Harmony Row	F.W. Thring			
The Hayseeds				
In the Wake of the Bounty	Charles Chauvel	Arthur Greenaway, Mayne Lynton, Errol Flynn, Victor Gouriet, John Warwick		
The Squatter's Daughter	Ken G. Hall	Constance Worth, Grant Lyndsay, John Warwick	Drama	IMDb
Two Minutes Silence				
Waltzing Matilda	Pat Hanna	Coral Browne, Norman French, Pat Hanna, Joan Lang, Nellie Mortyne, Dorothy Parnham, Joe Valli	Comedy	IMDb
1934
Cinesound Varieties				
Clara Gibbings				
Here Is Paradise				
The Man They Could Not Hang				
Secret of the Skies				
The Silence of Dean Maitland				
Splendid Fellows				
The Streets of London				
Strike Me Lucky				
A Ticket in Tatts				
Treasures of Katoomba	Frank Hurley		short subject	
When the Kellys Rode	Harry Southwell	Jack Appleton, George Doran, Robert Ingles, George Randall, Harry Simpson, Regina Somerville, Norman Waite	Drama/Western	IMDb
1935
The Burgomeister				
Grandad Rudd				
Heritage				
1936
Among the Hardwoods	Lyn T. Maplestone		Documentary	Shot by Bert Ive. Re-release of the original 1926 film with a soundtrack made up of natural sounds. BFI
The Flying Doctor				
It Isn't Done				
Orphan of the Wilderness				
Rangle River	Clarence G. Badger	Victor Jory, Margaret Dare	Western	
Thoroughbred				
Uncivilised	Charles Chauvel	Margot Rhys, Dennis Hoey, Ashton Jarry, Marcelle Marnay, Kenneth Brampton, Victor Fitzherbert, E. Gilbert Howell, Edward Sylveni, P. Dwyer, Rita Aslim, John Fernside, Jessica Malone, Richard Mazar, Z. Gee, David McNiven, Norman Rutledge	Adventure	IMDb
White Death	Edwin G. Bowen	James Coleman, Harold Colonna, Alfred Frith, Zane Grey, Nola Warren, John Weston	Adventure	IMDb
1937
The Avenger	A.R. Harwood	Douglas Stuart, John Fernside, Karen Greyson, Marcia Nelville, Marshall Crosby, George Lloyd, Raymond Longford, Pat Twohill, Jim Max, Albert Callanan, Reg King, Jack Couver, Val Atkinson, Fay Revel, Wyn Edgerton, Rae Maurice, Jeanne Battye, Mardy Harwood, Tich Irvine, Midge Harwood		IMDb
The Broken Melody	Ken G. Hall	Lloyd Hughes, Diana Du Cane	Drama	
Lovers and Luggers				
Mystery Island				
Phantom Gold				
1938
A Nation Is Built	Frank Hurley		Documentary	Australia's Sesquicentenary
Below the Surface	Rupert Kathner	Neil Carlton, Reg King, Jimmy McMahon, Phyllis Reilly, Lawrence Taylor, Stan Tolhurst	Drama	IMDb
Dad and Dave Come to Town	Ken G. Hall	Bert Bailey, Fred MacDonald	Comedy	IMDb
Let George Do It	Ken G. Hall	George Wallace, Joe Valli	Comedy	
Show Business	A. R. Harwood			
Typhoon Treasure	Noel Monkman			
1939
Gone to the Dogs	Ken G. Hall	George Wallace	Comedy	
Mr. Chedworth Steps Out	Ken G. Hall	Cecil Kellaway	Comedy	IMDb
Seven Little Australians	Arthur Greville Collins			

== See also ==
- 1930 in Australia
- 1931 in Australia
- 1932 in Australia
- 1933 in Australia
- 1934 in Australia
- 1935 in Australia
- 1936 in Australia
- 1937 in Australia
- 1938 in Australia
- 1939 in Australia
