= 1937 in Australia =

- Decades: 1910s; 1920s; 1930s; 1940s; 1950s
- See also: 1937 in Australian literature; Other events of 1937; Federal election; Timeline of Australian history

The following lists events that happened during 1937 in Australia.

1937 in Australia
- Monarch: George VI
- Governor-General: Alexander Hore-Ruthven, 1st Earl of Gowrie
- Prime minister: Joseph Lyons
- Population: 6,835,536
- Elections: Federal, VIC, TAS

== Incumbents ==
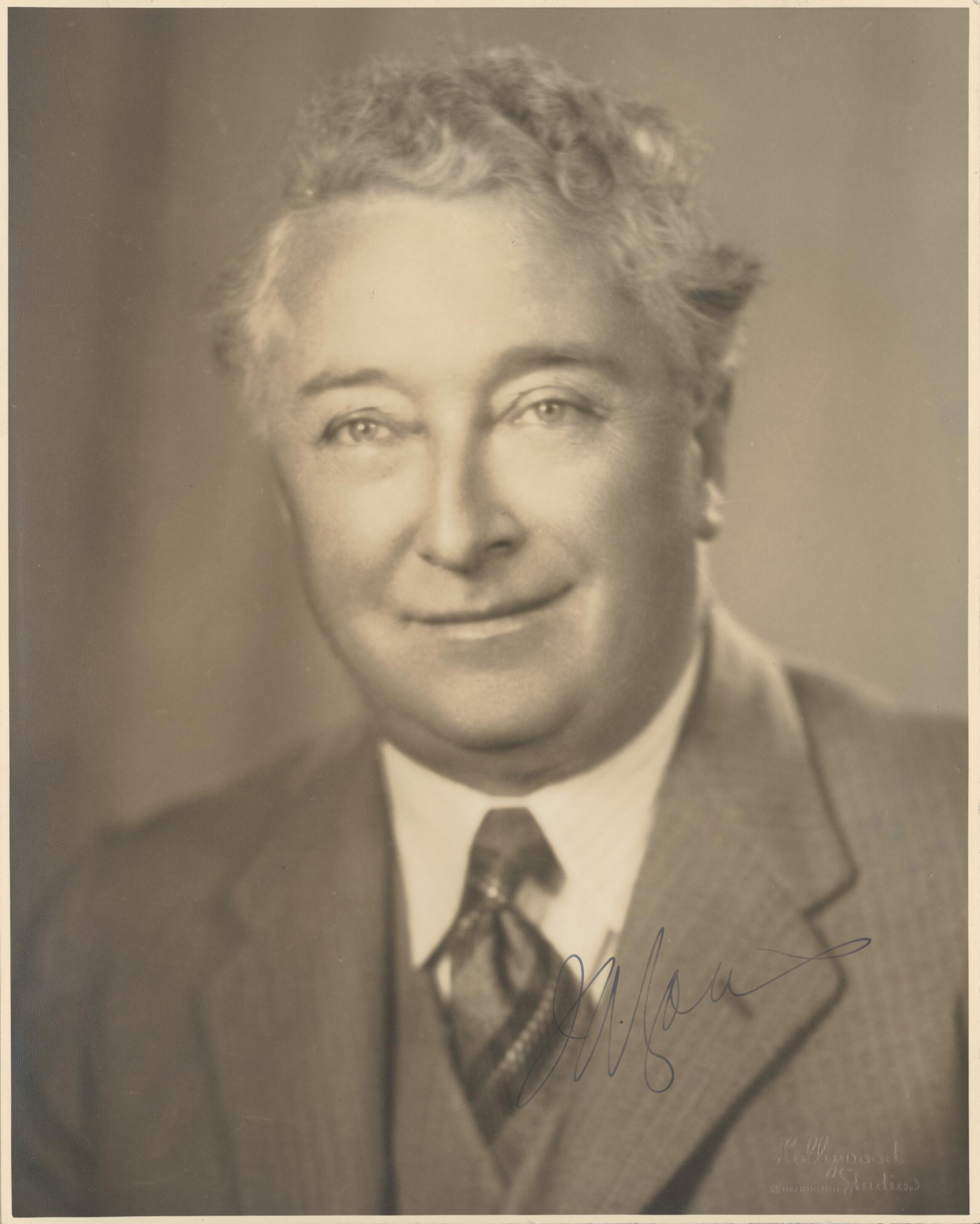
Joseph Lyons

- Monarch – George VI
- Governor-General – Alexander Hore-Ruthven, 1st Earl of Gowrie
- Prime Minister – Joseph Lyons
- Chief Justice – Sir John Latham

=== State Premiers ===
- Premier of New South Wales – Bertram Stevens
- Premier of Queensland – William Forgan Smith
- Premier of South Australia – Richard L. Butler
- Premier of Tasmania – Albert Ogilvie
- Premier of Victoria – Albert Dunstan
- Premier of Western Australia – John Willcock

=== State Governors ===
- Governor of New South Wales – John Loder, 2nd Baron Wakehurst (from 8 April)
- Governor of Queensland – Sir Leslie Orme Wilson
- Governor of South Australia – Sir Winston Dugan
- Governor of Tasmania – Sir Ernest Clark
- Governor of Victoria – William Vanneck, 5th Baron Huntingfield
- Governor of Western Australia – none appointed

== Events ==
- 9 February – Cairns is hit by a tropical cyclone.
- 15 February – An explosion kills 13 men at the State Coal Mine in Wonthaggi, Victoria.
- 20 February – A general election is held in Tasmania. The incumbent Labor government led by Albert Ogilvie is returned to power.
- 1 March – Bernard O'Reilly locates the wreckage of an Airlines of Australia Stinson airliner, VH-UHH City of Brisbane, in the McPherson Range in southern Queensland. Two survivors are rescued, five others did not survive.
- 20 April – Regular airmail services begin between Australia and the USA.
- 21-23 April - The first conference of Commonwealth and State Aboriginal authorities is held in Canberra. The conference sees several resolutions pass with the aim of assimilating Australian Aboriginals (excluding those deemed full-blooded) in white culture.
- 23 October – The ACTU calls on the government to boycott trade with Japan, following the Japanese invasion of China.

== Arts and literature ==
- 24 June – The Commonwealth Literature Censorship Board replaces the Book Censorship Advisory Committee, and temporarily lifts the ban on Ulysses by James Joyce.
- Sunbaker by photographer Max Dupain

== Sport ==
- 3 March – Captained by Don Bradman, Australia defeats England in the Fifth Test at the Melbourne Cricket Ground, retaining The Ashes.
- 25 September – Geelong become premiers of the 1937 VFL season, defeating Collingwood 18.14 (122) to 12.18 (90).
- 19 November – Hubert Opperman completes an epic bicycle ride from Fremantle, Western Australia to Sydney, taking 13 days, 10 hours and 11 minutes.
- Eastern Suburbs win the premiership in a shortened 1937 NSWRFL season. University finish in last place for the fourth year in a row, and voluntarily withdraw from the premiership at the end of the season.

== Births ==
- 16 January – Lorraine Bayly, actor (died 2026)
- 19 January – John Lions, computer scientist and academic (died 1998)
- 21 January
  - Peter Gallagher, rugby league footballer (died 2003)
  - Michael Beahan, Labor Senator for Western Australia (died 2022)
- 25 January – John Watson, Liberal Senator for Tasmania (died 2025)
- 4 February – John Devitt, Olympic swimmer (died 2023)
- 7 February – Daryl Jackson, architect (died 2026)
- 19 February
  - Lee Harding, science fiction writer (died 2023)
  - Colin Ridgway, NFL American footballer (died 1993)
- 20 February – Robert Evans, minister and amateur astronomer (died 2022)
- 21 February – Ron Clarke, Olympic athlete (died 2015)
- 3 March – Kevin O'Halloran, Olympic swimmer (died 1976)
- 7 April – Louise Faulkner, missing woman
- 13 April – Col Joye, entertainer (died 2025)
- 19 April – Lindsay Fox, businessman
- 27 May – Peter Pinne, writer and composer
- 1 June – Colleen McCullough, novelist (died 2015)
- 11 June – Robin Warren, Nobel Prize-winning pathologist (died 2024)
- 7 July Jocelyn Newman, politician (died 2018)
- 26 July
  - Alan Cadman, politician
  - Guy Green, Governor of Tasmania (1995–2003) (died 2025)
- 28 August – Tony Marchant, Olympic track cyclist
- 1 September – Ian Callinan, High Court judge
- 4 September – Dawn Fraser, Olympic swimmer
- 17 September – Gary Chapman, Olympic swimmer (died 1978)
- 18 September – Barry Muir, rugby league footballer (died 2022)
- 3 October – John Hodges, Minister for Immigration (1982–1983) (died 2024)
- 7 October – Colin Guest, cricketer (died 2018)
- 10 October – Bruce Devlin, golfer
- 21 November – John Kerin, politician (died 2023)
- 12 December
  - Michael Jeffery, Governor-General of Australia (died 2020)
  - Judy Tegart, tennis player
- 17 December – Kerry Packer, businessman (died 2005)

== Deaths ==
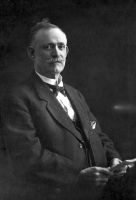
George Prendergast

- 11 February – Walter Burley Griffin, architect of Canberra (born in the United States and died in India) (b. 1876)
- 18 March – Walter Wilson Froggatt, geologist and economic entomologist (b. 1858)
- 7 May – Christina Jane Corrie, Queensland politician and suffragette (born in the United Kingdom) (b. 1867)
- 9 June – Charles Chewings, geologist and anthropologist (b. 1859)
- 10 July – Thomas Brentnall, accountant and musician (born in the United Kingdom) (b. 1846)
- 22 July – Ted McDonald, cricketer and Australian rules footballer (Essendon, Fitzroy) (died in the United Kingdom) (b. 1891)
- 28 July – Sir George Hyde, 7th Naval Member and Chief of the Australian Naval Staff (born in the United Kingdom) (b. 1877)
- 14 August – Bruce Smith, New South Wales politician (born in the United Kingdom) (b. 1851)
- 28 August – George Prendergast, 28th Premier of Victoria (b. 1854)
- 28 September – William Ramsay Smith, physician and anthropologist (born in the United Kingdom) (b. 1859)
- 2 October – Sir Granville Ryrie, New South Wales politician, diplomat and soldier (b. 1865)
- 8 October – Dame Eadith Walker, philanthropist and heiress (b. 1861)
- 4 November – Alfred Walter Campbell, neurologist (b. 1868)
- 6 November – William Moore, art and drama critic (b. 1868)
- 17 November – Jack Worrall, cricketer and Australian rules footballer (Fitzroy) (b. 1861)
- 19 November – Rayner Hoff, sculptor (born in the United Kingdom) (b. 1894)
- 27 November – Walter Howchin, geologist (born in the United Kingdom) (b. 1845)
- 11 December – Godfrey Irving, 8th Chief of the General Staff (b. 1867)
- 16 December – Sir Murray Bourchier, 5th Deputy Premier of Victoria and soldier (died in the United Kingdom) (b. 1881)

== See also ==
- List of Australian films of the 1930s
