= 1933 in Australia =

- Decades: 1910s; 1920s; 1930s; 1940s; 1950s
- See also: 1933 in Australian literature; Other events of 1933; Timeline of Australian history

The following lists events that happened during 1933 in Australia.

1933 in Australia
- Monarch: George V
- Governor-General: Isaac Isaacs
- Prime minister: Joseph Lyons
- Population: 3,262,728
- Elections: SA, WA

== Incumbents ==
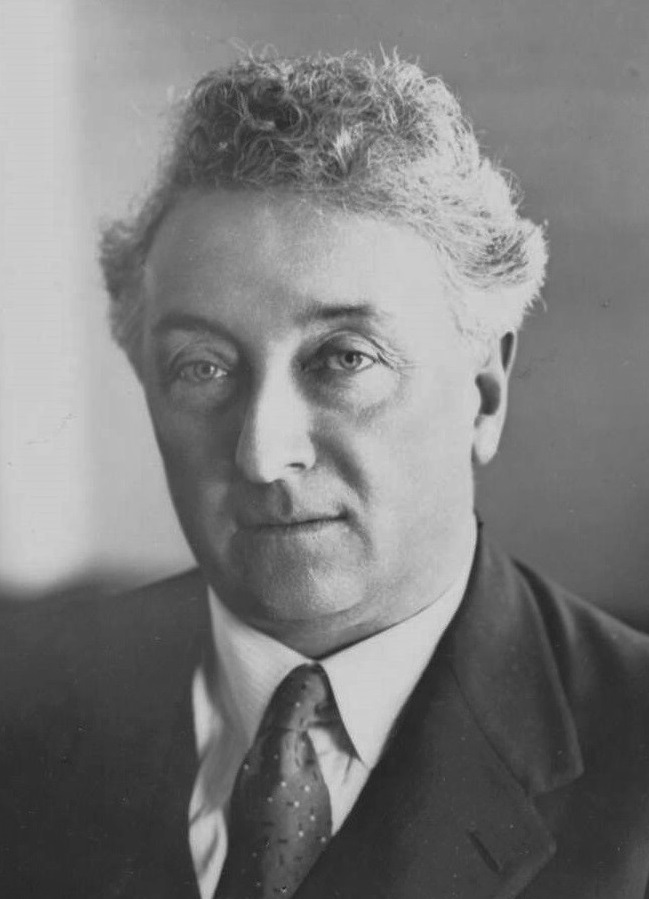
Joseph Lyons

- Monarch – George V
- Governor-General – Sir Isaac Isaacs
- Prime Minister – Joseph Lyons
- Chief Justice – Frank Gavan Duffy

=== State Premiers ===
- Premier of New South Wales – Bertram Stevens
- Premier of Queensland – William Forgan Smith
- Premier of South Australia – Lionel Hill (until 13 February), then Robert Richards (until 18 April), then Richard L. Butler
- Premier of Tasmania – John McPhee
- Premier of Victoria – Sir Stanley Argyle
- Premier of Western Australia – James Mitchell (until 24 April), then Philip Collier

=== State Governors ===
- Governor of New South Wales – Sir Philip Game
- Governor of Queensland – Sir Leslie Orme Wilson
- Governor of South Australia – Sir Alexander Hore-Ruthven
- Governor of Tasmania – Sir Ernest Clark (from 4 August)
- Governor of Victoria – none appointed
- Governor of Western Australia – none appointed

== Events ==
- 8 April – A referendum is held in Western Australia, which is carried 2 to 1 in favour of secession from the Commonwealth of Australia.
- 26 April – The seaplane carrier, HMAS Albatross, is paid off into reserve.
- 10 June – The Australian Women's Weekly is first published.
- 13 June – The Australian Antarctic Territory is established.
- 30 June - The third national Australian Census is taken, recording the population at 6,630,600.
- 28 August – The Brisbane newspaper, The Courier-Mail, is first published.
- 5 September – Australia signs a trade agreement with New Zealand.
- 6 September – Windscreen wipers become compulsory on all Australian cars.
- 13 October – The first traffic lights in Sydney become operational at the intersection of Kent and Market Streets.

== Arts and literature ==
- Charles Wheeler wins the Archibald Prize with his portrait of Ambrose Pratt
- Blinky Bill: The Quaint Little Australian, the first Blinky Bill book is published by children's author Dorothy Wall

== Film ==
- Errol Flynn makes his first film appearance, In the Wake of the Bounty, directed by Charles Chauvel

== Sport ==
- 9 September – The 1933 NSWRFL season culminates in Newtown's 18–5 victory against St. George in the premiership final. Western Suburbs finish in last place, claiming the "wooden spoon".
- Hall Mark wins the Melbourne Cup
- New South Wales wins the Sheffield Shield
- England defeats Australia 4–1 in The Ashes series

== Births ==
- 2 January – Ed Casey (died 2006), banker and politician
- 19 January – Leslie Dayman (died 2023), actor
- 23 January – Bill Hayden (died 2023), Governor-General of Australia (1989–1996)
- 29 January – Rosemary Adey, softball player (died 2013)
- 12 February – Brian Carlson (died 1987), rugby league footballer
- 22 February – Faith Thomas (died 2023), cricketer and hockey player
- 20 March – Ian Walsh (died 2013), rugby league footballer and coach
- 15 April – David Martin (died 1990), Governor of New South Wales (1989–1990)
- 27 May – Michael Crouch (died 2018), investor, water boiler manufacturer
- 13 July – Kel O'Shea (died 2015), rugby league footballer
- 25 July – Owen Abrahams (died 2006), Australian rules footballer
- 27 July – Ted Whitten (died 1995), Australian rules footballer
- 19 August – Patricia Kailis (died 2020), businesswoman, neurologist and geneticist
- 30 August – Keith Payne, soldier
- 14 September – Zoe Caldwell (died 2020), actress
- 15 September – Monica Maughan (died 2010), actress
- 3 October – Neale Fraser (died 2024), tennis player
- 6 October – Diane Cilento (died 2011), actress
- 11 October – Gary O'Callaghan (died 2017), radio personality
- 19 October – Brian Booth (died 2023), cricketer
- 29 October – John Andrews (died 2022), architect
- 1 December – James Wolfensohn (died 2020), President of the World Bank
- 5 December – Harry Holgate (died 1997), Premier of Tasmania (1991–1992)
- 19 December – Kevan Gosper (died 2024), athlete, sports administrator and businessman
- 20 December – Ted Mack (died 2018), politician
- 26 December – Ugly Dave Gray, television personality

== Deaths ==
- 7 January – Bert Hinkler, aviation pioneer (died in Italy) (b. 1892)
- 9 January – Daphne Akhurst, tennis player (b. 1903)
- 10 January – Richard Buzacott, Western Australian politician (b. 1867)
- 17 January – John Hodges, cricketer (born in the United Kingdom) (b. 1855)
- 5 February – Josiah Thomas, New South Wales politician (born in the United Kingdom) (b. 1863)
- 16 February – Archie Jackson, cricketer (born in the United Kingdom) (b. 1909)
- 21 March – James Edmond, journalist (born in the United Kingdom) (b. 1859)
- 15 April – Alfred Stephens, writer and literary critic (b. 1865)
- 20 April – Sir William Rooke Creswell, 1st Naval Officer Commanding the Commonwealth Naval Forces (born in Gibraltar) (b. 1852)
- 30 April – Robert Hamilton Russell, surgeon (born in the United Kingdom) (b. 1860)
- 4 June – Herbert Basedow, South Australian politician, anthropologist, geologist and explorer (b. 1881)
- 22 June – Harold Desbrowe-Annear, architect (b. 1865)
- 20 July – William Lowrie, agricultural educationist (b. 1857)
- 26 July – Sir Joseph Verco, physician and conchologist (b. 1851)
- 10 August – Alf Morgans, 4th Premier of Western Australia (born in the United Kingdom) (b. 1850)
- 7 October – Sir Alexander Peacock, 20th Premier of Victoria (b. 1861)
- 15 November – Affie Jarvis, cricketer (b. 1860)
- 19 November – Hugo Throssell, soldier and Victoria Cross recipient (b. 1884)

== See also ==
- List of Australian films of the 1930s
