= 1938 in Australia =

- Decades: 1910s; 1920s; 1930s; 1940s; 1950s
- See also: 1938 in Australian literature; Other events of 1938; Timeline of Australian history

The following lists events that happened during 1938 in Australia.

1938 in Australia
- Monarch: George VI
- Governor-General: Alexander Hore-Ruthven, 1st Baron Gowrie
- Prime minister: Joseph Lyons
- Population: 6,898,541
- Elections: SA, NSW, QLD

== Incumbents ==
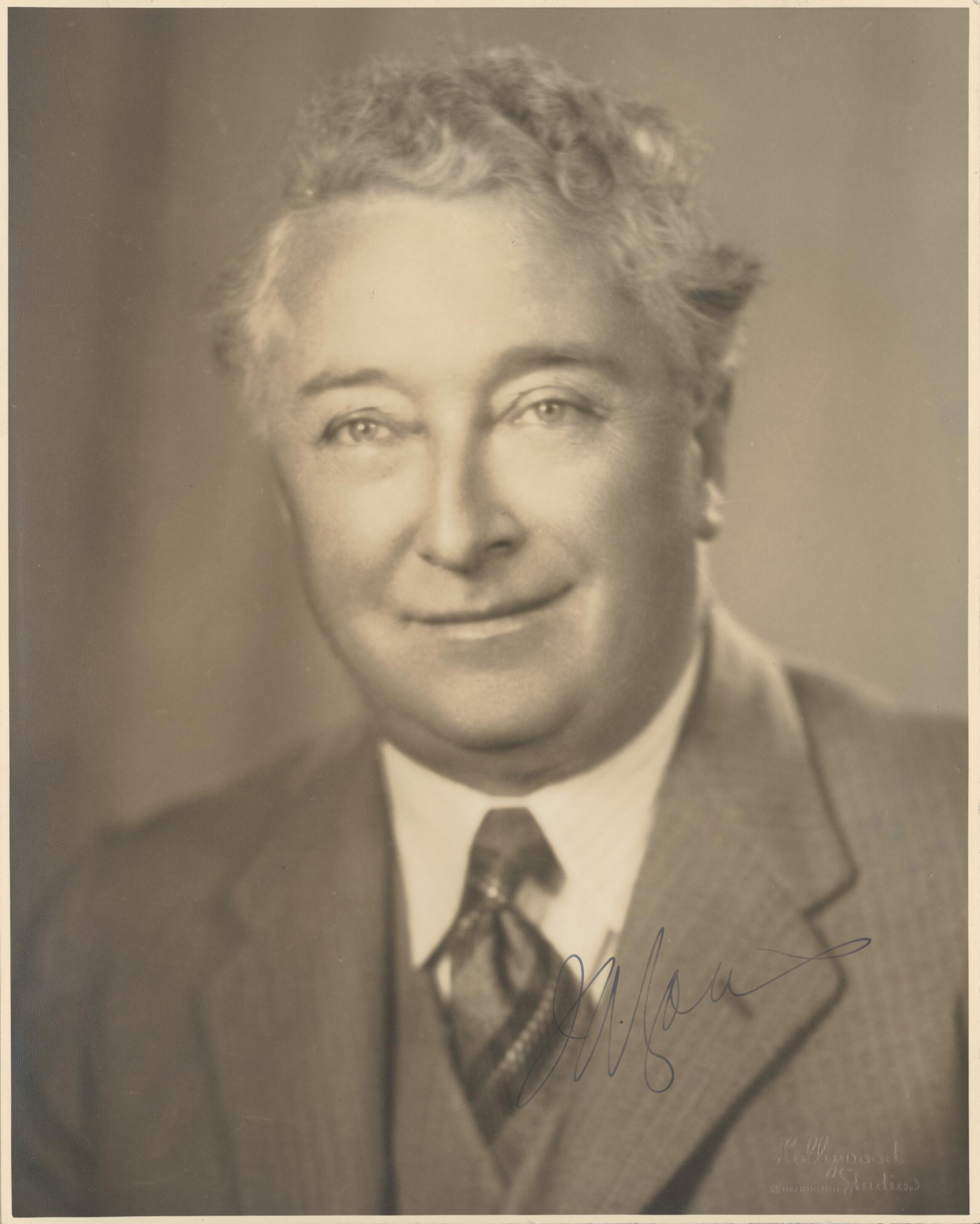
Joseph Lyons

- Monarch – George VI
- Governor-General – Alexander Hore-Ruthven, 1st Baron Gowrie
- Prime Minister – Joseph Lyons
- Chief Justice – Sir John Latham

=== State Premiers ===
- Premier of New South Wales – Bertram Stevens
- Premier of Queensland – William Forgan Smith
- Premier of South Australia – Richard L. Butler (until 5 November), then Thomas Playford IV
- Premier of Tasmania – Albert Ogilvie
- Premier of Victoria – Albert Dunstan
- Premier of Western Australia – John Willcock

=== State Governors ===
- Governor of New South Wales – John Loder, 2nd Baron Wakehurst
- Governor of Queensland – Sir Leslie Orme Wilson
- Governor of South Australia – Sir Winston Dugan
- Governor of Tasmania – Sir Ernest Clark
- Governor of Victoria – William Vanneck, 5th Baron Huntingfield
- Governor of Western Australia – none appointed

== Events ==
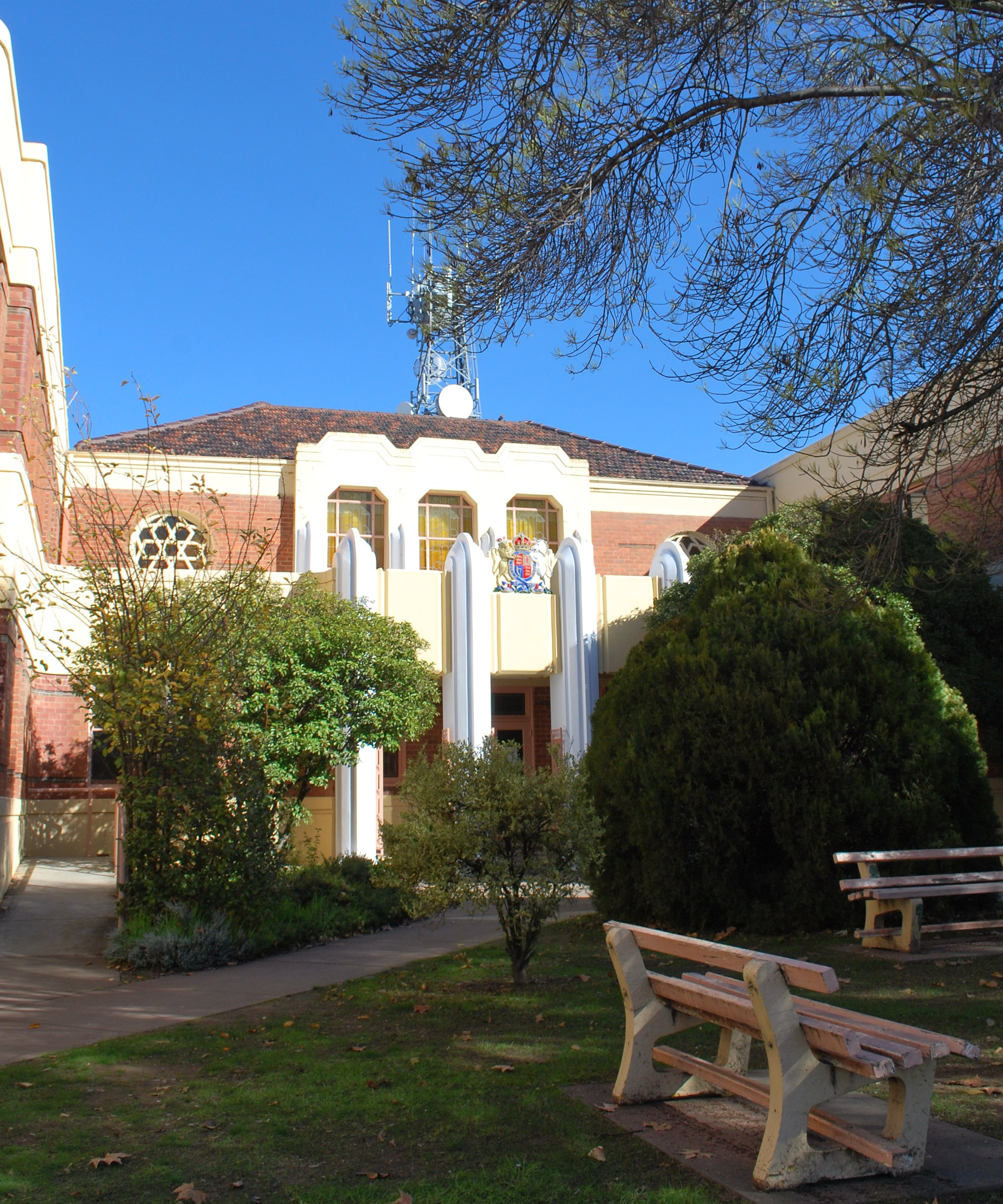
Wangaratta Courthouse, built in 1938

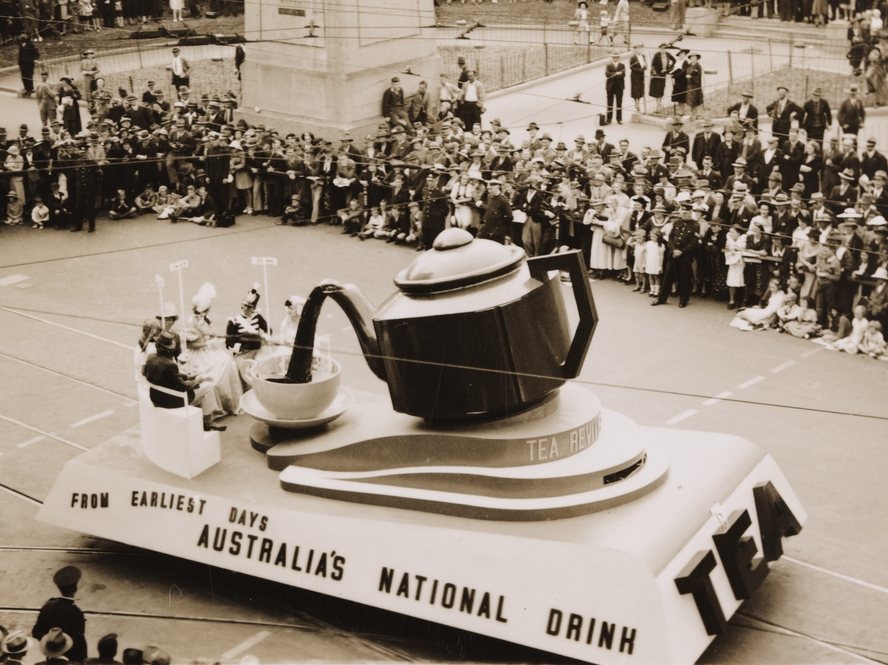
"Tea, Australia's national drink" (float) from Sesquicentenary Manufacturers Parade, Sydney, 1938

- 26 January – Australia officially celebrates its sesquicentennial, the 150th anniversary of European settlement. Unofficially, it is a Day of Mourning for Indigenous Australians.
- 6 February – Three hundred beachgoers are dragged out to sea when three freak waves strike Bondi Beach in Sydney in an event known as "Black Sunday". A team of eighty surf lifesavers manage to rescue all but five people.
- 13 February – Nineteen people die when Sydney ferry the Rodney, carrying 150 passengers, capsizes in Sydney Harbour while farewelling US Navy cruiser USS Louisville.
- 1 April – New monthly newspaper Abo Call begins publication in Sydney, focusing on issues of Aboriginal rights and edited by activist Jack Patten.
- 11 May – Two jockeys are killed and two are injured in a horse racing accident at Morphettville Racecourse in Adelaide, South Australia.
- 25 October – Eighteen people die in Australia's worst air disaster when the Douglas DC-2 Kyeema crashes in the Dandenong Ranges in thick fog.
- 15 November – Waterside workers at Port Kembla, New South Wales refuse to load a consignment of scrap iron destined for Japan, arguing that it would be used for munitions. Attorney-General Robert Menzies attempts to force the loading of the cargo, earning himself the nickname "Pig Iron Bob".
- 21 December – A direct radio-telephone link is established between Canberra and Washington D.C.
- 28 December – The Sydney Mail ceases publication.

== Arts and literature ==
- 31 March – Xavier Herbert wins the Commonwealth 150th anniversary literary award for his novel Capricornia.
- 30 December – The Passing of the Aborigines by Daisy Bates is published.

== Sport ==
- 5 to 12 February – The 1938 British Empire Games are held in Sydney. Australia leads the medal tally at the games, winning 25 gold medals, 19 silver and 22 bronze.
- 19 March – The 1938 Interstate Grand Prix is staged at the Wirlinga circuit in New South Wales.
- 20 August – At Royal Park, Melbourne, the Australia national netball team defeated New Zealand 40–11. This was the first netball Test between Australia and New Zealand.
- 2 September – Canterbury-Bankstown defeat Eastern Suburbs 19 to 6 in the grand final, becoming premiers of the 1938 NSWRFL season. St. George finish in last place, claiming the wooden spoon.
- 1 November – Catalogue wins the Melbourne Cup.

== Births ==
- 3 January – Alan Ramsey, journalist (died 2020)
- 12 January
  - Lewis Fiander, actor (died 2016)
  - Noel McNamara, crime victims supporter
- 13 January – Daevid Allen, musician (Soft Machine) (died 2015)
- 17 January – David Theile, backstroke swimmer
- 21 January – Steve Dunleavy, journalist (died 2019)
- 21 February – John Harvey, racing driver (died 2020)
- 25 February – Herb Elliott, athlete
- 28 February – Dennis Olsen, pianist, actor and director
- 1 March – Henry Reynolds, historian
- 5 March – Mike Walsh, television presenter
- 16 March – Jock Austin, Indigenous Australian community leader (died 1990)
- 19 March – John Winneke, judge (died 2019)
- 25 March – Anthony Carwardine, naval officer
- 20 April – Betty Cuthbert, athlete (died 2017)
- 29 April – Jim Lenehan, rugby union player (died 2022)
- 5 June – Roy Higgins, jockey (died 2014)
- 18 June – Kevin Murray, Australian rules footballer (Fitzroy)
- 19 June – Ian Smith, actor and screenwriter
- 20 June – Joan Kirner, Premier of Victoria (1990–1992) (died 2015)
- 23 June – John Gerovich, Australian rules footballer
- 25 June – Mick Allen, rower (died 2021)
- 27 June
  - Bob Baxt, lawyer (died 2018)
  - Gordon Rorke, cricketer (died 2025)
- 28 June – Sergio Silvagni, Australian rules footballer (died 2021)
- 8 July – Paul Cronin, television and film actor (died 2019)
- 13 July – Ian Macphee, politician, Minister for Immigration
- 15 July – Carmen Callil, publisher (died 2022)
- 16 July – Colin Rice, Australian rules footballer
- 23 July – Bert Newton, entertainer (died 2021)
- 28 July – Robert Hughes, art critic (died 2012)
- 9 August – Rod Laver, tennis player
- 12 August – Lionel Morgan, rugby league player (died 2023)
- 22 August – Roger Gyles, lawyer and judge (died 2025)
- 30 August – Murray Gleeson, High Court judge
- 2 September – Ernie Sigley, entertainer (died 2021)
- 8 October – Fred Stolle, tennis player (died 2025)
- 17 October – Les Murray, poet (died 2019)
- 30 October – Morris Lurie, writer (died 2014)
- 8 November – Bob Skilton, Australian rules footballer (South Melbourne)
- 26 November – Rodney Jory, physicist (died 2021)
- 4 December – Yvonne Minton, operatic soprano
- 11 December – Reg Livermore, actor, singer and television presenter
- 21 December – Frank Moorhouse, writer (died 2022)

== Deaths ==
- 6 January – John Gavin (born 1875), film director
- 15 January – Paul Raphael Montford (born 1868), sculptor
- 21 January – Will Dyson (born 1880), cartoonist
- 31 January – John Barnes (born 1868), politician
- 16 February – Thomas Molloy (born 1852), WA politician
- 21 April – Sir Talbot Hobbs (born 1864), architect
- 11 May – Lawrence Wells (born 1860), explorer
- 17 May – Nora Clench (born 1867), Canadian violinist
- 17 June – Ranji Hordern (born 1883), cricketer
- 19 June – Jack Hides (born 1906), explorer
- 22 June – C. J. Dennis (born 1876), poet
- 29 June – Sir Colin Mackenzie (born 1877), anatomist and museum administrator
- 30 August – Evelyn Marsden (born 1883), survivor of the Titanic
- 11 September – Sir Philip Whistler Street (born 1863), NSW Supreme Court judge
- 12 October – Hugh Massie (born 1854), cricketer
- 25 October – Charles Hawker (born 1884), politician
- 29 November – John Sandes (born 1863), journalist and author

== See also ==
- List of Australian films of the 1930s
