= 1936 in Australia =

- Decades: 1910s; 1920s; 1930s; 1940s; 1950s
- See also: 1936 in Australian literature; Other events of 1936; Timeline of Australian history

The following lists events that happened during 1936 in Australia.

1936 in Australia
- Monarch: George V, then Edward VIII, then George VI
- Governor-General: Isaac Isaacs, then Alexander Hore-Ruthven
- Prime minister: Joseph Lyons
- Population: 6,778,372
- Elections: Western Australia

== Incumbents ==
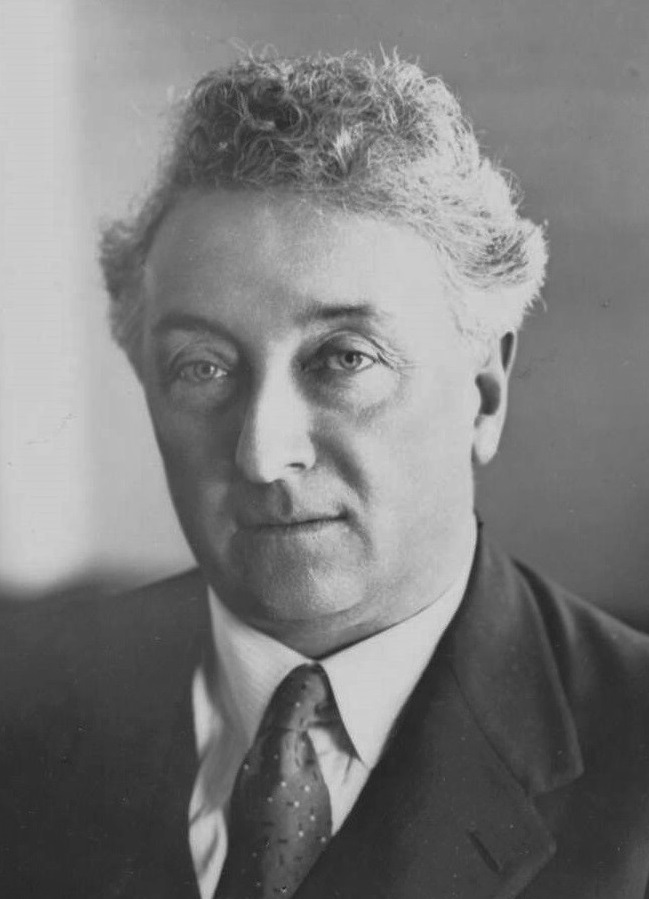
Joseph Lyons

- Monarch – George V (until 20 January), then Edward VIII (until 11 December), then George VI
- Governor-General – Sir Isaac Isaacs (until 23 January), then Alexander Hore-Ruthven, 1st Baron Gowrie
- Prime Minister – Joseph Lyons
- Chief Justice – Sir John Latham

=== State Premiers ===
- Premier of New South Wales – Bertram Stevens
- Premier of Queensland – William Forgan Smith
- Premier of South Australia – Richard L. Butler
- Premier of Tasmania – Albert Ogilvie
- Premier of Victoria – Albert Dunstan
- Premier of Western Australia – Philip Collier (until 20 August), then John Willcock

=== State Governors ===
- Governor of New South Wales – Alexander Hore-Ruthven, 1st Baron Gowrie (until 22 January), then Sir David Anderson (from 6 August)
- Governor of Queensland – Sir Leslie Orme Wilson
- Governor of South Australia – Sir Winston Dugan
- Governor of Tasmania – Sir Ernest Clark
- Governor of Victoria – William Vanneck, 5th Baron Huntingfield
- Governor of Western Australia – none appointed

== Events ==
- 15 January – Torres Strait Islanders begin a four-month general maritime strike, in an effort to take control their own affairs and gain fairer treatment.
- 20 January – King George V dies, and is succeeded as King of Australia by his son, Edward VIII.
- 1 February – Special patrol officers are appointed to safeguard Aboriginal welfare in the Northern Territory.
- 24 February – A special conference of the Australian Labor Party re-admits former Premier of New South Wales, Jack Lang, after a five-year expulsion.
- 12 March – Western Australia makes voting compulsory in state elections.
- 25 March – A submarine communications cable between Victoria and Tasmania commences operation.
- 1 July – Australian National Airways is registered as a company.
- 8 July – The Federal Government announces an increase in military training strength, in response to the rise of fascism in Europe.
- 7 September – The last known thylacine (Tasmanian tiger) dies at Hobart Zoo.
- 20 October – British woman Mabel Freer is refused entry to Australia on morality grounds, sparking a political controversy.
- 10 November – The High Court of Australia rules in the case of R v Burgess; Ex parte Henry, that the Commonwealth government's power to regulate interstate trade and commerce did not extend to intrastate trade and commerce.
- 11 December – King Edward VIII abdicates from the throne of the United Kingdom, and is succeeded as King of Australia by his brother George VI.
- 16 December – A Brisbane to Adelaide air race is held to commemorate South Australia's centenary. Ivy May Pearce makes national headlines as the youngest entrant who recorded the fastest time of any woman pilot, heavily handicapped and just two seconds behind the eventual winner. In this race she even beat Reg Ansett, founder of Ansett Airlines. Ivy went on to win many air races.

=== Unknown ===
- Grant v The Australian Knitting Mills – a landmark case in consumer law.

== Arts and literature ==
- "Dawn Song" for piano and cello or viol published by Australian Composer Louis Isodore Lavater

"Dawn Song"

"By Starlight"
MIDI file of "By Starlight" (1936) by Louis Lavater

== Sport ==
- 12 September – The 1936 NSWRFL season culminates in Eastern Suburbs' 32–12 victory over Balmain in the premiership final. University finish in last place, claiming the wooden spoon for the third year in a row.

== Births ==
- 7 January – Ben Cropp, hunter and photographer
- 8 January – Robert May, Baron May of Oxford, scientist and life peer of the United Kingdom (died 2020)
- 10 January – Burnum Burnum, Aboriginal activist, author and actor (died 1997)
- 22 January – Noel Kelly, professional rugby league footballer and coach (died 2020)
- 23 January – Brian Howe, politician
- 2 February – John Hyde, politician
- 3 February – Bob Simpson, cricketer (died 2025)
- 13 February – Judith Rodriguez, poet (died 2018)
- 17 February – Barry Jarman, cricketer (died 2020)
- 24 February – John Baker, soldier and Chief of the Defence Force (died 2007)
- 27 February
  - Ron Barassi, Australian rules football player and coach (died 2023)
  - Ian Tomlinson, triple and long jumper (died 1995)
- 28 February – Robin Klein, author
- 2 March – Alan Scott, Australian blacksmith, brick oven constructor (died 2009)
- 6 May – Brian Johns, managing director of the ABC (1995–2000) (died 2016)
- 6 June – Elaine Darling, Queensland politician (died 2019)
- 16 June – Charles Perkins, Aboriginal activist (died 2000)
- 29 June – Eddie Mabo, indigenous land rights campaigner (died 1992)
- 30 June – Barry Gration, senior officer in the Royal Australian Air Force
- 26 July – John Bathersby, Catholic bishop (died 2020)
- 10 August – Frank Ford, politician
- 16 August – Lindsay Gaze, basketballer
- 25 August – Ian Thorogood, Australian rules footballer and coach (died 2019)
- 28 September – Eddie Lumsden, rugby league player (died 2019)
- 13 October – Robert Ingpen, graphic designer and illustrator
- 19 October – Rex Harry, cricketer (died 2019)
- 4 November – Brian Gibson, Senator for Tasmania (died 2017)
- 5 November – Robert O'Neill, military historian (died 2023)
- 16 November – John Moore, Minister for Defence (1998–2001) (died 2025)
- 11 December – Maggie Tabberer, fashion model and media personality (died 2024)
- 27 December
  - James Harrison, blood donor (died 2025)
  - Alex Miller, novelist

== Deaths ==
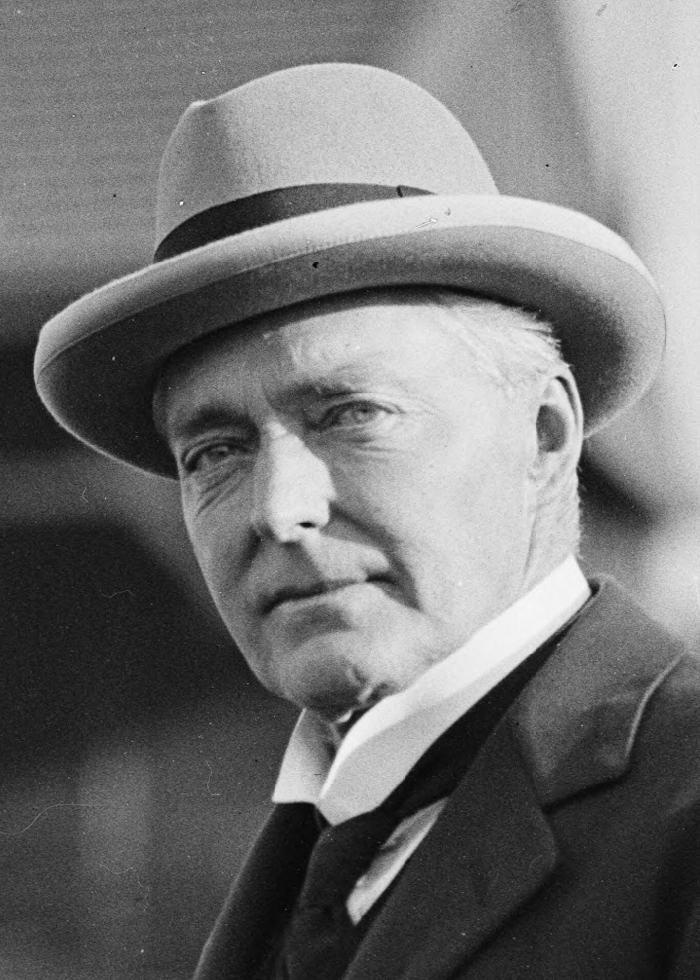
Henry Forster, 1st Baron Forster

- 15 January – Henry Forster, 1st Baron Forster, 7th Governor-General of Australia (born and died in the United Kingdom) (b. 1866)
- 22 February – John Allan, 29th Premier of Victoria (b. 1866)
- 4 March – Arthur H. Adams, journalist and author (died in New Zealand) (b. 1872)
- 23 March – Oscar Asche, actor, writer and producer (died in the United Kingdom) (b. 1871)
- 10 June
  - Sir John Bowser, 26th Premier of Victoria (died in the United Kingdom) (b. 1856)
  - Arthur Henry Shakespeare Lucas, schoolmaster and scientist (born in the United Kingdom) (b. 1853)
- 26 June – Samuel Mauger, Victorian politician (b. 1857)
- 21 July – William Frederick Foster, New South Wales politician and builder (b. 1865)
- 27 July – Sir Albert Gould, New South Wales politician (b. 1847)
- 29 July – Sir Frank Gavan Duffy, 4th Chief Justice of Australia (born in Ireland) (b. 1852)
- 7 September – The last captive thylacine (b. unknown)
- 28 September – Thomas Glassey, 1st Queensland Opposition Leader (born in Ireland) (b. 1844)
- 3 October – William Webster, New South Wales politician (born in the United Kingdom) (b. 1860)
- 28 October – Sir Newton Moore, 8th Premier of Western Australia (died in the United Kingdom) (b. 1870)
- 6 November – Sir Littleton Groom, Queensland politician (b. 1867)
- 16 November – Jens Jensen, Tasmanian politician (b. 1865)

== See also ==
- List of Australian films of the 1930s
