= Damilola Akinwunmi =

Nigerian music executive and entrepreneur

Damilola Dapper Akinwunmi
- Born: Damilola Joseph Akinwunmi; August 1994 (age 32); Southwestern Nigeria
- Other names: Dapper, Dapper Damm
- Education: University of Lagos (BSc Sociology)
- Occupations: Music executive, entrepreneur
- Years active: 2014–present
- Organization: Dapper Group
- Known for: Founder and CEO of Dapper Group; development of Nigerian street-pop artists
- Notable work: Trench Symphony, Trench Fest, Hue Visual Platform, Banger Only Productions

Damilola "Dapper" Akinwunmi (born August 1994), is a Nigerian music executive and entrepreneur. He is the founder and chief executive officer of Dapper Group, a music and entertainment company based in Lagos, Nigeria.

Under his leadership, Dapper Music & Entertainment, the group's flagship label, emerged as one of the leading Nigerian-owned record labels in terms of streaming market share in 2024.

== Early life and education ==
He later attended the University of Lagos (UNILAG), where he earned a Bachelor of Science degree in Sociology. During an academic strike in 2012, he began exploring opportunities in music management and media, which later led to his entry into the professional music industry.

== Career ==
Early management (2014–2016)

Akinwunmi began his professional career in 2014 as an artist manager. He is credited with discovering and managing the Nigerian artist Dotman, helping guide the artist to mainstream recognition. During this period he also worked with other performers, including Koker (singer).

Temple Management Company (2016–2018)

Between 2016 and 2018, Akinwunmi worked as a talent representative at Temple Management Company, a Lagos-based entertainment agency. In this role he managed or worked with artists such as Iyanya, and producers including Tee-Y Mix and Adey.

Founding of Dapper Group (2018–present)

In 2018 he founded Dapper Group, which later expanded into a multi-division entertainment company involved in music distribution, publishing, live events, and film production. The company operates several subsidiaries including Dvpper Digital, Dapper Music & Entertainment, Dapper Live, Dapper Films, and S94 Publishing.

Through Dapper Music, Akinwunmi has worked with several Nigerian artists including Ice Prince, Seyi Vibez, Shallipopi, T.I Blaze, Balloranking, TML Vibez, Rybeena, Lasmid, Cazulee, BNXN, Kashcoming, and Bhadboi OML.

== Projects and initiatives ==
Akinwunmi has launched several music and creative industry initiatives through Dapper Group.

Trench Symphony

Trench Symphony (2025) is a signature live concert series produced by Dapper Live, designed to explore the intersection of Street-pop, Fuji music, live orchestration, and operatic arrangements. As a cultural experiment in Nigeria, the project reimagines indigenous Nigerian sounds through a theatrical and orchestral lens, contributing to a broader conversation around the evolution and global perception of contemporary African music. The series also marked a major milestone by breaking the Guinness World Record for the Largest Orchestra for an Afrobeats Concert.

Banger Only Productions (BOP)

Launched in 2025, Banger Only Productions (BOP) is a production-focused division that provides management, branding, and royalty administration services for music producers.

Hue Visual Platform

The Hue platform is a minimalist live performance series created to highlight African artists in intimate acoustic settings that emphasize vocal performance rather than elaborate stage production.

Trench Fest

Trench Fest is a touring concert franchise that brought large-scale music events to cities such as Ibadan and Lagos, focusing on artists emerging from Nigeria's street-pop scene.

Giddy Girls

Giddy Girls is an all-female teen vocal collective introduced in 2025 that provides professional background vocals on several commercial music releases.

== Awards and recognition ==
- Executive of the Year (2023) – TurnTable Charts Power List
- Executive of the Quarter (Q1 2023) – TurnTable Charts
- Top 30 Music Executives in Nigeria – TurnTable Power List (2023, 2024, 2025)
- Dapper Group surpassing 1 billion total music streams by Q3 2024
