= 1935 in Australia =

- Monarch: George V
- Governor-General: Isaac Isaacs
- Prime minister: Joseph Lyons
- Population: 6,726,258
- Elections: NSW, QLD, VIC

- Decades: 1910s; 1920s; 1930s; 1940s; 1950s
- See also: 1935 in Australian literature; Other events of 1935; Timeline of Australian history

The following lists events that happened during 1935 in Australia.

== Incumbents ==
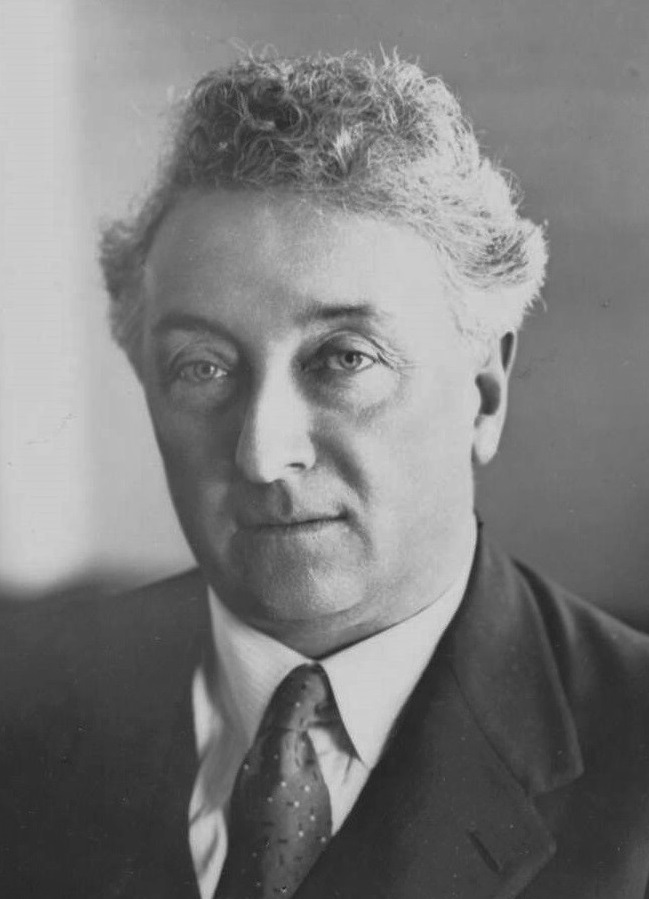
Joseph Lyons

- Monarch – George V
- Governor-General – Sir Isaac Isaacs
- Prime Minister – Joseph Lyons
- Chief Justice – Frank Gavan Duffy (until 1 October) then Sir John Latham

=== State Premiers ===
- Premier of New South Wales – Bertram Stevens
- Premier of Queensland – William Forgan Smith
- Premier of South Australia – Richard L. Butler
- Premier of Tasmania – Albert Ogilvie
- Premier of Victoria – Sir Stanley Argyle (until 2 April), then Albert Dunstan
- Premier of Western Australia – Philip Collier

=== State Governors ===
- Governor of New South Wales – Sir Philip Game (until 15 January), then Alexander Hore-Ruthven, 1st Baron Gowrie (from 21 February)
- Governor of Queensland – Sir Leslie Orme Wilson
- Governor of South Australia – Sir Winston Dugan
- Governor of Tasmania – Sir Ernest Clark
- Governor of Victoria – William Vanneck, 5th Baron Huntingfield
- Governor of Western Australia – none appointed

== Events ==
- 26 February – Qantas Empire Airways makes its first scheduled international flight, when a De Havilland Express departs Darwin bound for Singapore.
- 2 March – A general election is held in Victoria. The UAP-Country Party coalition wins a comfortable majority.
- 29 March – 141 people drown when a cyclone strikes the pearling fleet off the coast of Broome, Western Australia.
- 2 April – Stanley Argyle stands down as Premier of Victoria after the Country Party dissolves their coalition with the UAP. He is succeeded by Country Party leader Albert Dunstan.
- 1 July – The Australian Associated Press (AAP) news agency is established.
- 2 October – John Curtin replaces James Scullin as leader of the Australian Labor Party.
- 4 October – Luna Park in Sydney is officially opened.
- 14 October – The Hornibrook Bridge, connecting Redcliffe and Sandgate in Queensland, is officially opened.
- 31 December – The cane toad is introduced to Queensland.

== Arts and literature ==
- John Longstaff wins the Archibald Prize with his portrait of Banjo Paterson
- Olive Cotton takes the photograph Teacup Ballet
- Scottish painter Ian Fairweather moves to Melbourne and is soon noticed by local artists as a significant painter.

== Sport ==
- 15 February – Cricket: Victoria wins the Sheffield Shield.
- 11 May – Rugby league: St. George beats Canterbury 91 points to 6 for the highest score and biggest win in NRL history.
- 14 September – Rugby league: The 1935 NSWRFL season culminates in Eastern Suburbs' 19–3 victory over South Sydney in the premiership final. University finish in last place, claiming the wooden spoon.
- 5 October – Australian rules football: Collingwood 11.12 (78) beats South Melbourne 7.16 (58) for its tenth premiership. Bob Pratt missed the game due to a car accident.
- 5 November – Horse racing: Marabou wins the Melbourne Cup.

== Births ==
- 3 January – Geof Motley, Australian rules footballer and coach (d. 2023)
- 6 January – Ian Meckiff, cricketer
- 9 January – Brian Harradine, politician (d. 2014)
- 19 January – Johnny O'Keefe, entertainer (d. 1978)
- 3 February – Doreen Kartinyeri, Ngarrindjeri elder and historian (d. 2007)
- 18 February – Lance Oswald, Australian rules footballer (d. 2019)
- 3 March – Mal Anderson, tennis player (d. 2026)
- 5 March – Philip K. Chapman, astronaut (d. 2021)
- 12 March – Keith Slater, sportsman (d. 2025)
- 20 March – Jeffrey Miles, judge (d. 2019)
- 30 March – John Thornett, rugby union player (d. 2019)
- 7 April – Mervyn Crossman, field hockey player (d. 2017)
- 10 April – Peter Hollingworth, bishop and Governor General of Australia (d. 2026)
- 14 April – Barbara Frawley, actress (d. 2004)
- 12 May – Leneen Forde, Governor of Queensland
- 15 May – Bill Peach, journalist (d. 2013)
- 26 June – Edwin Hodgeman, actor
- 30 June – Ken Turner, Australian rules footballer (d. 2022)
- 2 July – Philip Flood, diplomat and public servant
- 4 July – Alan Preen, Australian rules footballer (d. 2016)
- 7 July – John Kingston, politician (d. 2024)
- 9 July – Kevin Parks, Australian rules footballer
- 10 July – Wilson Tuckey, politician
- 30 July – Bruce Reid, politician (d. 2020)
- 2 August – Sir Llew Edwards, 23rd Deputy Premier of Queensland (d. 2021)
- 6 August – Geoff Harvey, musician and television personality (d. 2019)
- 8 August – John Laws, radio personality (d. 2025)
- 18 September – Geoff Case, football player (d. 2018)
- 28 September
  - Eddie Lumsden, rugby league footballer (d. 2019)
  - Bruce Crampton, golfer
- 7 October – Thomas Keneally, writer
- 4 November – Barry Crocker, entertainer
- 23 November – Ken Eastwood, cricketer
- 28 November – Randolph Stow, writer (d. 2010)
- 2 December – John Spender, politician and barrister (d. 2022)
- 10 December – Steve Condous, politician (d. 2018)
- 13 December – Arthur Summons, rugby footballer (d. 2020)
- 27 December – Raymond Apple, rabbi (d. 2024)
- 28 December – Eileen Massey, cricketer (d. 2019)

== Deaths ==
- 9 January – Alexander Poynton, South Australian politician (b. 1853)
- 8 April – David Watkins, New South Wales politician (b. 1865)
- 2 September – Sir Sidney Kidman, pastoralist and entrepreneur (b. 1857)
- 22 September – Sir Elliott Lewis, 19th Premier of Tasmania (b. 1858)
- 25 September – Tom Richards, rugby union player and military officer (b. 1882)
- 8 November – Charles Kingsford Smith, aviator (died in the Andaman Sea) (b. 1897)
- 20 December – Martin O'Meara, Irish-born soldier, Victoria Cross recipient (b. 1882)

== See also ==
- List of Australian films of the 1930s
