= Arthur Hurst =

Arthur Hurst may refer to:

- Art Hurst (1923–1993), Canadian ice hockey player
- Arthur Frederick Hurst (1879–1944), British physician
- Arthur Hurst (footballer) (born 1931), Australian rules footballer
