= 1931 in Australia =

- Decades: 1910s; 1920s; 1930s; 1940s; 1950s
- See also: 1931 in Australian literature; Other events of 1931; Federal election; Timeline of Australian history

The following lists events that happened during 1931 in Australia.

1931 in Australia
- Monarch: George V
- Governor-General: John Baird, 1st Viscount Stonehaven, then Isaac Isaacs
- Prime minister: James Scullin
- Population: 6,526,485
- Elections: Federal, Tasmania

== Incumbents ==
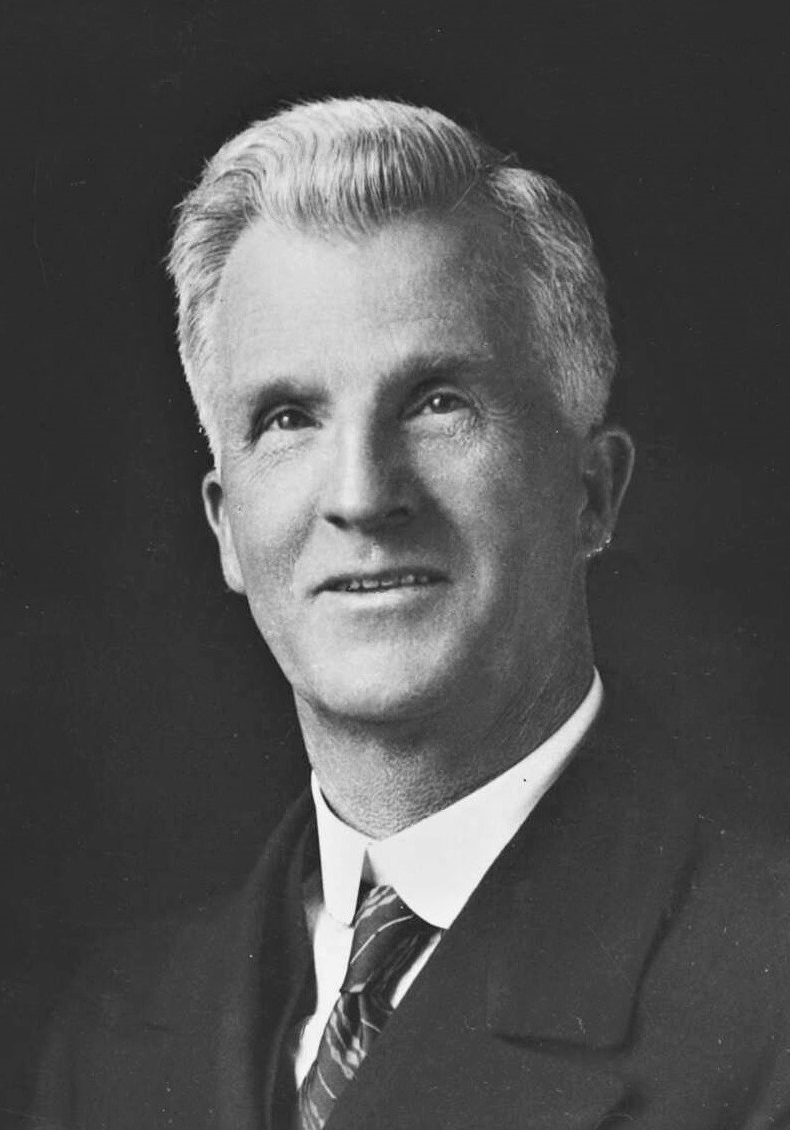
James Scullin

- Monarch – George V
- Governor-General – John Baird, 1st Viscount Stonehaven (until 21 January), then Sir Isaac Isaacs
- Prime Minister – James Scullin
- Chief Justice – Isaac Isaacs (until 21 January) then Frank Gavan Duffy

=== State Premiers ===
- Premier of New South Wales – Jack Lang
- Premier of Queensland – Arthur Edward Moore
- Premier of South Australia – Lionel Hill
- Premier of Tasmania – John McPhee
- Premier of Victoria – Edmond Hogan
- Premier of Western Australia – James Mitchell

=== State Governors ===
- Governor of New South Wales – Sir Philip Game
- Governor of Queensland – Sir John Goodwin
- Governor of South Australia – Sir Alexander Hore-Ruthven
- Governor of Tasmania – none appointed
- Governor of Victoria – Arthur Somers-Cocks, 6th Baron Somers (until 23 June)
- Governor of Western Australia – Sir William Campion (until 9 June)

== Events ==
- 7 January – Guy Menzies flies the first solo non-stop trans-Tasman flight (from Australia to New Zealand) in 11 hours and 45 minutes, crash-landing on New Zealand's west coast.
- 10 January – The Beef Riot takes place in Adelaide. Seventeen people are injured when unemployed men clash with police while protesting the decision to remove beef from the dole ration.
- 21 January – Isaac Isaacs becomes the first Australian-born Governor-General.
- 22 January – The Commonwealth Court of Conciliation and Arbitration announces a 10% reduction in the basic wage, in addition to reductions made in accordance with the fall in the cost of living index, effective from 1 February.
- 4 February – Joseph Lyons resigns from the federal cabinet of James Scullin, after Scullin re-appoints Ted Theodore as Treasurer.
- 18 February – The Royal Australian Navy light cruiser HMAS Pioneer is scuttled off Sydney Heads.
- 4 March – Holden's Motor Body Builders is purchased by General Motors, and is renamed General Motors–Holden's Ltd.
- 10 March – The first Apex Club is formed in Geelong, Victoria.
- 21 March – The Australian National Airways aircraft Southern Cloud, carrying 8 persons, disappears on a flight between Sydney and Melbourne. The wreckage is not located until 1958.
- 7 May – Joseph Lyons forms the United Australia Party, through the amalgamation of ALP defectors, Nationalists and anti-Labor citizens' groups.
- 9 May – A general election is held in Tasmania, which implements compulsory voting clauses of the Electoral Act for the first time. The Nationalist Party led by John McPhee defeats the Australian Labor Party, and substantially increasing its majority.
- 15 August – The two ends of the Sydney Harbour Bridge are joined in the middle.
- 25 November – The Lang Labor group led by Jack Lang vote with the Opposition on a motion of no confidence against James Scullin's government, triggering an early election.
- 19 December – A federal election is held. The incumbent Australian Labor Party led by James Scullin is defeated by former Labor MP Joseph Lyons and the United Australia Party.

== Arts and literature ==
- John Longstaff wins the Archibald Prize with his portrait of Sir John Sulman

== Sport ==
- 9 May - Richmond set a record VFL score of 30.19 (199) against North Melbourne. This record stands until 1969. Doug Strang, with fourteen goals, and Jack Titus, with eight, combine for 22 goals - a total equalled by Templeton and Dunstan in 1978 but never beaten
- 12 September - South Sydney 12 defeat Eastern Suburbs 7 for their tenth NSWRL premiership
- 10 October - Geelong 9.14 (68) beats Richmond 6.12 (48) for its second premiership
- White Nose wins the Melbourne Cup
- Victoria wins the Sheffield Shield

== Births ==
- 1 February – Roger Covell, musicologist (died 2019)
- 14 February – Esme Timbery, Bidjigal artist and shellworker (died 2023)
- 24 February – Barry Oakley, writer
- 25 February – Eric Edgar Cooke, serial killer (died 1964)
- 5 March –
  - George Ogilvie, film and theatre director (died 2020)
  - Barry Tuckwell, horn player and conductor (died 2020)
- 11 March – Rupert Murdoch, businessman
- 20 March – James Mollison, art gallery director (died 2020)
- 26 April – John Cain, Premier of Victoria (died 2019)
- 30 May – Diana Fisher, journalist and television presenter (died 2023)
- 2 June – Peter Cummins, actor (died 2024)
- 14 June – Ross Higgins, actor (died 2016)
- 21 June – Francis Macnab, christian minister (died 2023)
- 22 June – Ian Browne, track cyclist (died 2023)
- 24 June – Marjorie Margaret Conley, operatic soprano (died 1959)
- 27 June – Geoffrey Harcourt, academic economist (died 2021)
- 4 July – Bill Gleeson, Australian rules footballer (died 1998)
- 13 July – Arthur Hurst, Australian rules footballer (died 2014)
- 19 July – Alan Wrigley, writer and commentator
- 20 July – Phil Coles, canoeist and sports administrator (died 2023)
- 15 September – Brian Henderson, broadcaster (died 2021)
- 9 October – Stuart Devlin, artist and metalworker (died 2018)
- 14 October – Mary Hardy, actress and comedian (died 1985)
- 19 October – Dick Fenton-Smith, Australian rules footballer (died 2021)
- 21 November – Malcolm Williamson, composer (died 2003)

== Deaths ==
- 17 February – Norman Cameron, Tasmanian politician (b. 1851)
- 23 February – Dame Nellie Melba, opera singer (b. 1861)
- 9 March – John Chanter, New South Wales politician (b. 1845)
- 22 August – Edward Dyson, poet and novelist (b. 1865)
- 14 September – Tom Roberts, artist (born in the United Kingdom) (b. 1856)
- 8 October – Sir John Monash, general (b. 1865)
- 28 October – Paddy Glynn, South Australian politician (born in Ireland) (b. 1855)
- 20 December – James Stewart, Queensland politician (born in the United Kingdom) (b. 1850)

== See also ==
- List of Australian films of the 1930s
