= Brentnall =

Brentnall is a surname. Notable people with the surname include:

- Bev Brentnall (born 1936), New Zealand cricketer
- Frederick Thomas Brentnall (1834–1925), English-born Australian Wesleyan preacher and politician
- Greg Brentnall (born 1956), Australian rugby league footballer
- Lyndon Brentnall, security company owner, RMS Protective Services
- Sandra Brentnall (born 1962), Australian soccer player
- Thomas Brentnall (1846–1937), English-born Australian chartered accountant
