= Adey =

Adey is a surname of English origin. At the time of the British Census of 1881, its relative frequency was highest in Berkshire (10.1 times the British average), followed by Staffordshire, Wiltshire, Cardiganshire, Hampshire, Warwickshire, the Channel Islands, Dorset, County Durham ,Gloucestershire and Nottinghamshire .

Notable people with the surname include:

- Bryan Adey (born 1972), Swiss - Canadian civil engineer
- Garry Adey (1945–2023), English rugby union footballer
- Paul Adey (born 1963), Canadian ice hockey player and coach
- Rosemary Adey (1933–2013), Australian softball player
- Steve Adey, English musician
- William James Adey CMG (1874–1956) South Australian educationist

Spelling variations include:

- Ady, Adie, Addy, Addey, and Adee.

== See also ==
- Adey-Jones
