= 1932 in Australia =

- Decades: 1910s; 1920s; 1930s; 1940s; 1950s
- See also: 1932 in Australian literature; Other events of 1932; Timeline of Australian history

The following lists events that happened during 1932 in Australia.

1932 in Australia
- Monarch: George V
- Governor-General: Isaac Isaacs
- Prime minister: James Scullin; Joseph Lyons
- Population: 6,576,824
- Elections: NSW, VIC, QLD

== Incumbents ==
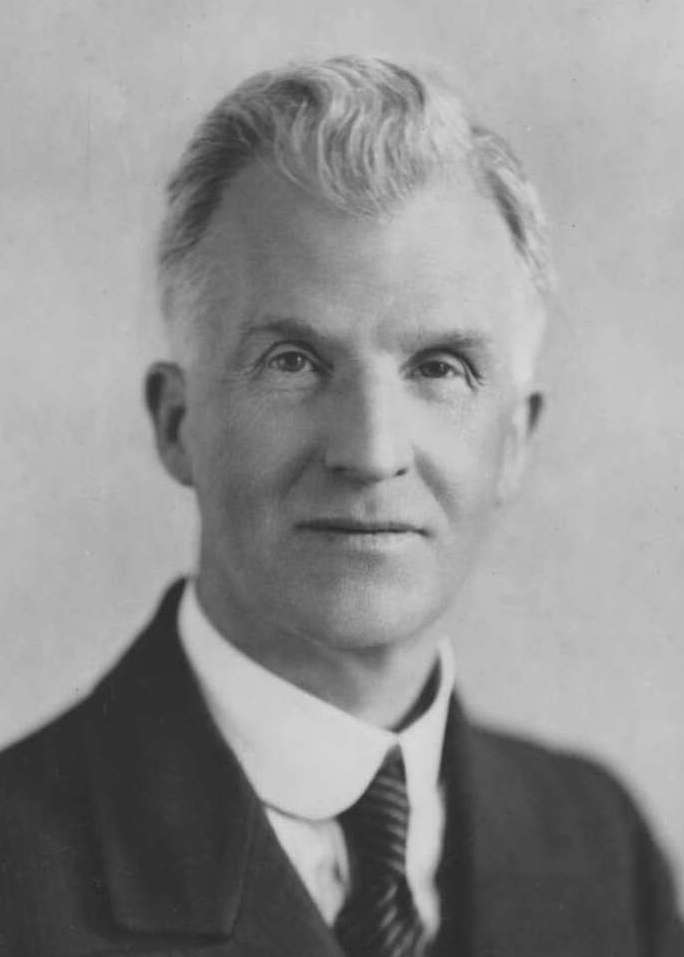
James Scullin

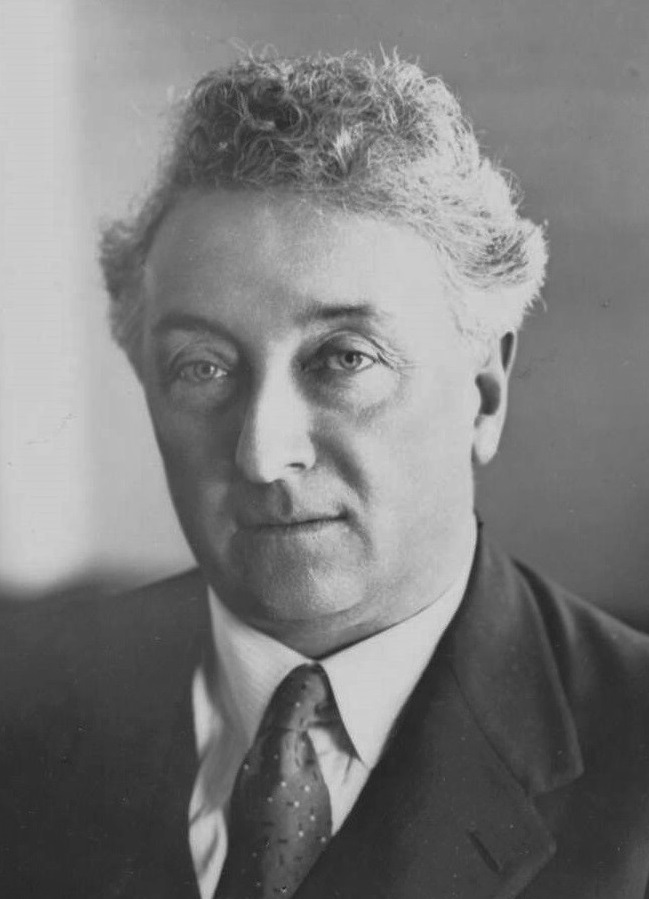
Joseph Lyons

- Monarch – George V
- Governor-General – Sir Isaac Isaacs
- Prime Minister – James Scullin (until 6 January), then Joseph Lyons
- Chief Justice – Frank Gavan Duffy

=== State Premiers ===
- Premier of New South Wales – Jack Lang (until 13 May) then Bertram Stevens
- Premier of Queensland – Arthur Edward Moore (until 17 June) then William Forgan Smith
- Premier of South Australia – Lionel Hill
- Premier of Tasmania – John McPhee
- Premier of Victoria – Edmond Hogan (until 19 May) then Sir Stanley Argyle
- Premier of Western Australia – James Mitchell

=== State Governors ===
- Governor of New South Wales – Sir Philip Game
- Governor of Queensland – Sir John Goodwin (until 7 April), then Sir Leslie Orme Wilson (from 13 June)
- Governor of South Australia – Sir Alexander Hore-Ruthven
- Governor of Tasmania – none appointed
- Governor of Victoria – none appointed
- Governor of Western Australia – none appointed

== Events ==
- Unemployment reached a record high of about 32%.
- 19 March – The Sydney Harbour Bridge is officially opened by the Premier of New South Wales, Jack Lang.
- 30 March – The Grey Street Bridge is officially opened in Brisbane by the Governor of Queensland, Sir John Goodwin.
- 13 May – The Premier of New South Wales, Jack Lang, is dismissed by the Governor, Sir Philip Game.
- 14 May – A state election is held in Victoria. The Labor Party, already divided over the Premiers' Plan, is heavily defeated by a United Australia Party–United Country Party coalition.
- 11 June – A state election in New South Wales, called after the dismissal of Jack Lang as Premier, is held. Lang's Labor Party is heavily defeated, losing 31 seats to the UAP–Country coalition.
- 1 July – The Australian Broadcasting Commission (ABC) is established
- 2 November – Start of the Emu War.
- 23 November – The statue of The Dog on the Tuckerbox is unveiled at Gundagai, New South Wales by Prime Minister Joseph Lyons.
- 10 December – The Emu War ends in failure.

== Science and technology ==
- 17 August – Botanist John McConnell Black is awarded the Mueller Medal by the Australian and New Zealand Association for the Advancement of Science.

== Arts and literature ==
'The Rivals Waltz' by Bert Rache in Albert's Old Time Dance Album 1932

- Ernest Buckmaster wins the Archibald Prize with his portrait of Sir William Irvine.
- The final issue of Aussie: The Australian Soldiers' Magazine appears.

== Film ==
- 4 March – Brigadier-General Iven Giffard Mackay is appointed as the Commonwealth Film Appeals Censor, replacing the Censorship Appeals Board.

== Sport ==
- 12 February – Australia defeats South Africa 5–0 in the cricket test series, played in Australia.
- 21 March – New South Wales wins the Sheffield Shield.
- Bodyline is first introduced into cricket
- The Australian Olympic team wins 3 gold, 1 silver and 1 bronze medal at the 1932 Summer Olympics held in Los Angeles
- 20 March – Racehorse Phar Lap, in Tijuana, Mexico, wins the Agua Caliente Handicap; across Australia, thousands celebrate after the radio broadcast of the race.
- 5 April – Racehorse Phar Lap dies midday at ranch in San Francisco, two weeks after winning at Agua Caliente racetrack (2 autopsies find nothing; however, trees had been sprayed with a lead–arsenate insecticide); it is 6 April at 10:30 am in Australia when news spreads.
- 24 September – The 1932 NSWRFL season culminates in South Sydney's 19–12 victory over Western Suburbs in the premiership final.
- 1 October – Richmond defeats Carlton 13.14 (92) to 12.11 (83) at the VFL Grand Final to become premiers of the 1932 VFL season.
- 1 November – Peter Pan wins the Melbourne Cup.

== Births ==
- 7 January – Joe Berinson, politician (died 2018)
- 28 January – Don McMichael, public servant (died 2017)
- 20 March – Kevin Bacon, equestrian (died 2020)
- 29 March – Toni Lamond, cabaret singer, stage actor, dancer and comedian (died 2025)
- 2 April – Michael Vernon, consumer activist (died 1993)
- 9 April – Gil Brealey, film producer and director (died 2018)
- 21 May – Brian Coleman, Australian rules footballer (died 1966)
- 10 June – Hedley Bull, political scientist (died 1985)
- 6 July – John O'Brien, tennis player
- 20 July – Michael Papps, sports shooter (died 2022)
- 28 July – Peter Hughes, ACT politician
- 15 August – Kevin Connor, artist, twice Archibald Prize winner (died 2025)
- August – Lowitja O'Donoghue, indigenous rights activist (died 2024)
- 4 September – John Herron, politician (died 2019)
- 23 September – Doug Sutherland, Lord Mayor of Sydney (1980–1987)
- 26 September – Stan Smith, Australian rules footballer (died 2012)
- 11 October – Barry Jones, politician
- 22 October – Slim Newton, country singer (died 2023)
- 20 November – James Hardy, businessman and yachtsman (d. 2023)

== Deaths ==
- 17 January – Albert Jacka, businessman, soldier and Victoria Cross recipient (b. 1893)
- 6 February – John Earle, 22nd Premier of Tasmania (b. 1865)
- 10 April – George Barber, Queensland politician (born in the United Kingdom) (b. 1860)
- 27 April – Sir Adrian Knox, 2nd Chief Justice of Australia (b. 1863)
- 9 June – Edith Cowan, Western Australian politician and social reformer (b. 1861)
- 17 June – Sir John Quick, Victorian politician and lawyer (born in the United Kingdom) (b. 1852)
- 23 June – Francis Kenna, Queensland politician, poet and journalist (b. 1865)
- 1 July – William Dick, New South Wales politician (b. 1865)
- 11 July – William Hartnoll, Tasmanian politician (b. 1841)
- 26 July – Sir William McPherson, 31st Premier of Victoria (b. 1865)
- 10 October – Sir Bertram Mackennal, sculptor and medalist (died in the United Kingdom) (b. 1863)
- 4 December – Mona McBurney, composer (born in the United Kingdom) (b. 1862)

== See also ==
- List of Australian films of the 1930s
