= Chewings =

Chewings may refer to:

- Charles Chewings (1859–1937), Australian geologist and anthropologist
- John Chewings (born 1920), New Zealand politician
