= Stan Smith (Australian footballer, born 1932) =

Australian rules footballer

Personal information
- Full name: Stanley Smith
- Born: 26 September 1932
- Died: 26 January 2012 (aged 79)
- Height: 182 cm (6 ft 0 in)
- Weight: 80 kg (176 lb)
- Position: Half back flank

Playing career^{1}
Years	Club	Games (Goals)
1951–1954	South Melbourne	26 (0)
- ^{1} Playing statistics correct to the end of 1954.

Stan Smith (26 September 1932 – 26 January 2012) was an Australian rules footballer who played with South Melbourne in the Victorian Football League (VFL).

Smith made six appearances, as a half back flanker, in the 1951 VFL season. He went to play a total of 26 games in four season.

After South Melbourne relocated to Sydney in 1982 to become the Sydney Swans, Smith was a part of a group of former players who assisted in reuniting the old South Melbourne players with the Sydney club.
