= Rex Harry =

Australian cricketer (1936–2019)

Personal information
- Full name: Rex Alexander Harry
- Born: 19 October 1936; Melbourne, Australia
- Died: 15 April 2019 (aged 82); Melbourne, Australia
- Batting: Right-handed
- Bowling: Right-arm leg-spin
- Role: Bowler

Domestic team information
- Years: Team
- 1961–62: Victoria
- Source: Cricinfo, 4 December 2015

Rex Alexander Harry (19 October 1936 – 15 April 2019) was an Australian cricketer. He played one first-class match for Victoria in 1962. A right-arm leg-spinner, he also played 122 matches for North Melbourne between 1956–57 and 1965–66, taking 239 wickets.

While attending University High School in Melbourne, Harry copied the unusual spin-bowling technique of the Test bowler Jack Iverson. He was successful in senior district cricket, but played only once in first-class cricket, when in Victoria's match against Tasmania in 1961–62 he took one wicket.

Harry died in Melbourne in April 2019, aged 82.
