= Bryan Adey =

Swiss-Canadian civil engineer

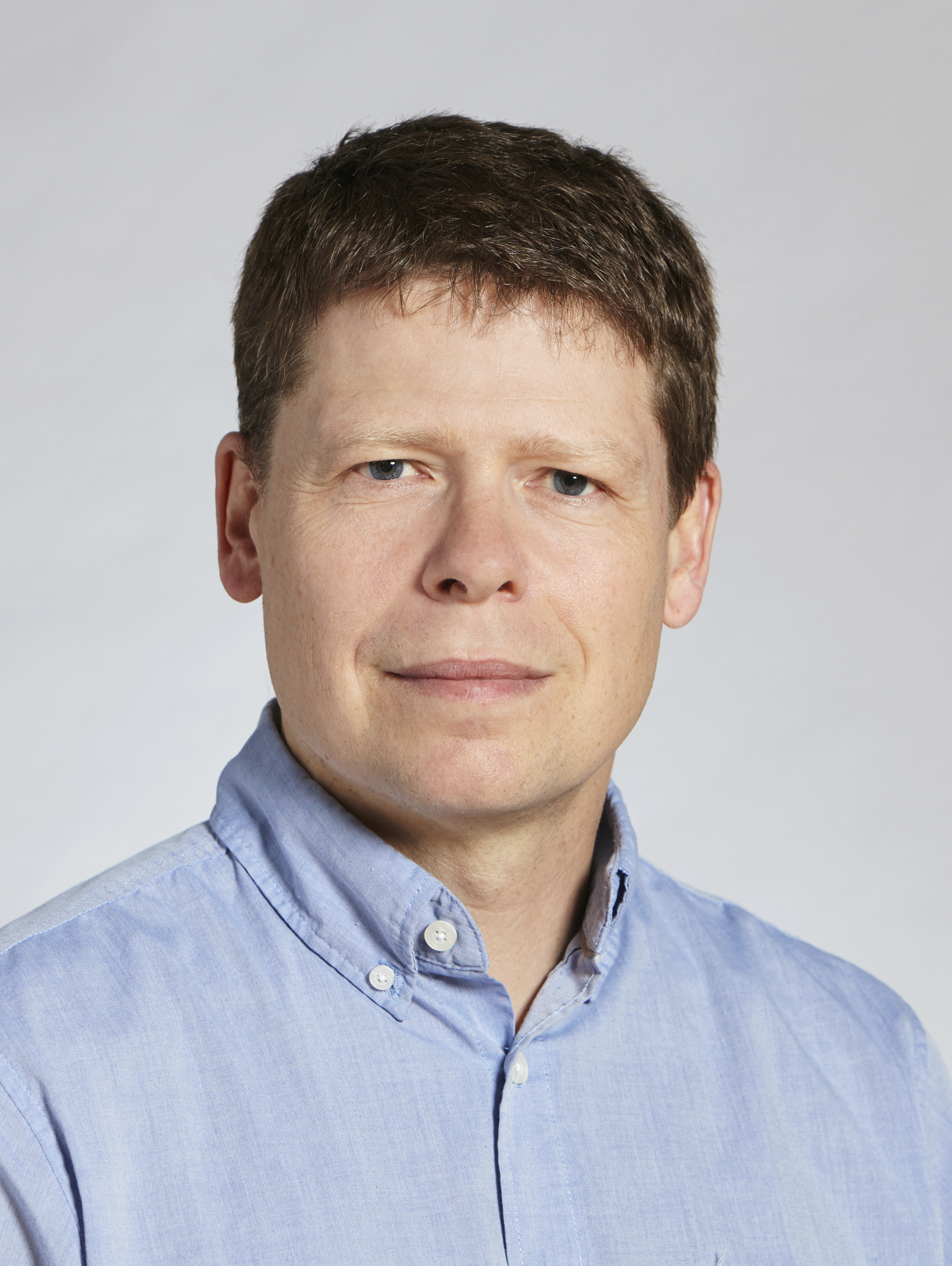
- Bryan Adey (2023)
- Born: 20 December 1972; Nova Scotia, Canada
- Education: EPF Lausanne
- Scientific career
- Workplaces: ETH Zürich, Institute for Construction and Infrastructure Management
- Thesis: A supply and demand system approach to the development of bridge management strategies (2002)

Bryan Tyrone Adey (born 20 December 1972 in Berwick, Nova Scotia, Canada) is a Swiss - Canadian civil engineer, full professor at the ETH Zurich, deputy head of the Department of Civil, Environmental and Geomatic Engineering (D-BAUG) at ETH Zurich, and co-founder of Carmentae Infrastructure Management.

== Early life and education ==
Adey obtained his Doctorate in Civil Engineering from the EPF Lausanne in 2002, his Master of Science in Structural Engineering from the University of Alberta, Edmonton, Canada in 1997, his Bachelor of Engineering from Dalhousie University, Halifax, Canada in 1995, and his Certificate of Applied Science from Acadia University, Wolfville, Canada in 1992. He has been living in Switzerland since 1998.

== Academic career ==
Adey joined the Institute for Construction and Infrastructure Management in the D-BAUG on Jan 1, 2010, as an associate professor. He was appointed full professor on Jan 1, 2018.

Between 2010 and 2023, Adey was the head or deputy head of the Institute for Construction and Infrastructure Management (IBI) at ETH Zurich.

Between 2020 and 2022, he was Director of Studies for the Curriculum Spatial Development & Infrastructure Systems (MSc) of D-BAUG at ETH Zurich and since 2022 he is the Deputy Head of D-BAUG at ETH Zurich. He is also a Principal Investigator for the Module Adaptive Mobility, Infrastructure, and Landscape (AMIL) in the ETH-Hub for the Future Cities Lab Global (FCL-Global) at the Singapore-ETH Centre.

Adey is also on the editorial board of the Journal of Infrastructure Asset Management and the Journal of Infrastructure Systems.

== Research contributions ==
Adey's research is focused on improving the effectiveness and efficiency of infrastructure management. This includes the definition and standardization of the infrastructure management process, from setting goals to determining optimal monitoring and intervention programs and evaluating the performance of infrastructure management organizations. It also includes the automation of parts of the infrastructure management process, e.g., the determination of optimal intervention strategies for single infrastructure objects and the development of algorithms to generate network intervention plans that maximize net benefit. Other themes of his research are estimating the risk related to infrastructure, including estimating infrastructure behavior when subject to extreme events, estimating the resilience of the infrastructure systems including consideration of the infrastructure, the environment in which it is embedded and the responsible managing organizations, and estimating the optimal ways to restore infrastructure following extreme events. Adey works on infrastructure management issues related to many types of infrastructure, including road networks, rail networks, water distribution networks, sewer networks and building portfolios.

Adey regularly participates as a speaker at conferences, symposiums, and workshops on infrastructure management issues, such as the International Symposium for Infrastructure Asset Management and the International Forum on Engineering Decision Making and contributes to UN and OECD events .

Adey has been actively involved in writing international and national codes and guidelines.

This includes leading:

1. The writing of the United Nations Stress Test Framework through the Economic Commission for Europe, Inland Transport Committee, Working Party on Transport Trends and Economics, Group of Experts on Assessment of Climate Change, Impacts and Adaptation for Inland Transport ECE/TRANS/WP.5/GE.3/2023/3, which was published in 2024.
2. The revision of Swiss Code: SN 640 900 Maintenance management: Base code, as the president of the code and research committee 4.3 of the Swiss Association of Road and Transportation Experts, which was published in 2022.
3. The writing of the CEN pre-code CEN/CLC/WS 018 "Guidelines for the assessment of the resilience of transport infrastructure to potentially disruptive events", which was published in 2021.

== Teaching ==
Adey's teaching is focused on developing infrastructure managers that are equipped to both professionally management infrastructure and to enable automation of parts of it in the organizations in which they will work. His lectures include Systems Engineering; Infrastructure Management 1: Process; Infrastructure Management 2: Evaluation tools; Infrastructure Management 3: Optimization tools; Project Management and Infrastructure Planning.

== Consulting activity ==
After leaving the EPF Lausanne in 2002, Adey co-founded the company Infrastructure Management Consultants with Rade Hajdin and worked as its vice president from 2003 to 2009. In 2016, he co-founded Carmentae Infrastructure Management with Jürgen Hackl and Clemens Kielhauser.The consulting company principally focuses on transforming infrastructure asset management within organisations who manage large amounts of public infrastructure, including road networks, rail networks, water distribution networks, sewer networks and building portfolios. The company is mainly active in Switzerland and the United Kingdom, with notable work on the Sustainable Investment Decision Making transformation of Scottish Water.

== Publications (selected) ==
- Adey, B.T., Martani, C., Hackl, J., (2022), Investing in water supply resilience considering uncertainty and management flexibility, Smart Infrastructure and Construction, 175(3), pp. 104–115, DOI: 10.1680/jsmic.21.00005.
- Burkhalter, M., Adey, B.T., (2022), Assessing the effects of closure free periods on railway intervention costs and service, Infrastructure Systems 8(3), 04022015-1, DOI 10.1061/(ASCE)IS.1943-555X.0000692.
- Burkhalter, M., Adey, B.T., (2022), Digitalising the determination of railway infrastructure intervention programs: A network optimisation model, Infrastructure Systems, 8(2), 04022012-1-15 DOI: 10.1061/(ASCE)IS.1943-555X.0000681.
- Adey, B.T., Martani, C., Kielhauser, C., Robles Urqulijo, I., Papathanasiou, N., Burkhalter M., (2021), Estimating, and setting targets for, the resilience of transport infrastructure, Special Issue: Resilient infrastructure for improved disaster management, Infrastructure Asset Management, 8(4), 167-190, DOI: 10.1680/jinam.20.00011.
- Kerwin, S., Adey, B.T., (2020), Optimal Intervention Planning: A Bottom-Up Approach to Renewing Aging Water Infrastructure, Water Resources Planning and Management, 146(7): 04020044, DOI: 10.1061/(ASCE)WR.1943-5452.0001217.
- Kielhauser, C., Adey, B.T., (2020), Determination of intervention programs for multiple municipal infrastructure networks: Considering network operator and service costs, Sustainable and Resilient Infrastructure, 5(1-2), 49-61, DOI 10.1080/23789689.2018.1497879.
- Adey, B.T., Martani, C., Papathanasiou, N., Burkhalter, M., (2019), Principles of estimating and communicating the risk of neglecting maintenance, Infrastructure Asset Management, 6(2), pp. 109–128; DOI: 10.1680/jinam.18.00027.
- Adey, B.T., (2019), A road infrastructure asset management process: Gains in efficiency and effectiveness, Infrastructure Asset Management, 6(1), March 2019, pp. 2-14, DOI: 10.1680/jinam.17.00018.
- Hackl, J., Lam, J.C., Heitzler, M., Adey, B.T., Hurni, L., (2018), Estimating network related risks: a methodology and an application for roads, Natural Hazards and Earth System Sciences, 18, 2273–2293 DOI: 10.5194/nhess-18-2273-2018.
- Kielhauser, C., Martani, C., Adey, B.T., (2018), Development of intervention programs for inland waterway networks using genetic algorithms, Structure and Infrastructure Engineering 14(5), 550-564, DOI: 10.1080/15732479.2017.1373299.
