= CMV Group =

- Type: Independent Retailer Group
- Industry: Transport
- Founded: 1934
- Founder: Sidney Crawford
- Headquarters: Adelaide, South Australia
- Number of locations: 1 (2014)
- Products: Cars, Trucks, Farms
- Revenue: $2 billion
- Number of employees: 1,600
- Website: cmv.com.au

The CMV Group is an Australian company which operates automotive dealerships and horticulture in South Australia and Victoria, employs more than 2,000 staff with an annual turnover in excess of $1 billion.

== History ==
In 1934, CMV's founder Sidney Crawford opened a dealership specialising in the sale and service of commercial transport vehicles, in particular British Leyland Trucks and the Diamond T brand. The company began distributing Case tractors in 1935 and Commer products in 1938.

In 1963, the company began selling Toyota commercial vehicles. Between 1968 and 1988, under Sidney's son Jim Crawford, the business expanded and diversified, developing three divisions, CMV Automotive, CMV Trucks and CMV Farms. These divisions grew, both through reinvestment of revenue and by the acquisition of new franchises.

In 2000, CMV opened a Mitsubishi / Volvo Trucks dealership in Melbourne.

In 2016 CMV managing director Paul Crawford was presented with the Australian Entrepreneur of the Year Industry Prize.

== Divisions ==
=== Trucks ===
In 2015, CMV operates 16 trucking and parts businesses throughout South Australia and Victoria. These include CMV Truck Sales Kenworth-DAF Adelaide, South Central Trucks in South Australia and CMV Truck and Bus with six locations throughout Victoria. Products include new and used, small, medium and heavy duty trucks, trailers and buses, and parts and service support.

This includes the recently acquired location of Wimmera Truck Centre based in Horsham and the Barry Maney Group based in Mount Gambier and Warrnambool. All three locations are Kenworth, DAF and Hino dealers. Barry Maney Group in Mount Gambier being the main dealership with multiple car franchises such as Ford, Hyundai and Volkswagen.

=== Agricultural ===
The Agricultural Division of the group was developed in 1978. In 2015, it specialises in wine grapes, pistachios and almonds. CMV Farms has land in Robinvale and Lindsay Point in Victoria, as well as Loxton and Langhorne Creek in South Australia.

=== Automotive ===
CMV entered the automotive market in 1963 through the sale of Toyota vehicles (around 3,800 that year). In 2010 CMI completed a four level Toyota dealership covering 500,000 square metres; this was one of 50 dealership projects planned by Toyota Australia that year, and was the newest of CMV's eight automotive businesses throughout South Australia.

The CMV Group have branched into Jeep, Chrysler, Dodge, Lexus and more recently, Mercedes-Benz

The CMV Group also have acquired the Barry Maney Group, adding Ford, Hyundai and Volkswagen into the many car franchises they operate with.

=== Coach ===
CMV owned the Briscoes coach operation in Adelaide. It was sold in the 1980s to Bus Australia.

== Community involvement ==
In 1993, The CMV Group established The CMV Foundation, a charitable trust deriving funding from the income of CMV's business operations. The employees of the CMV Group have established The CMV Staff Charitable Foundation, funded by voluntary contributions from staff, which are then matched dollar for dollar by the CMV Foundation and donated to registered charities.
