= Norman Waite =

English footballer

Personal information
- Full name: Norman Waite
- Date of birth: 15 February 1898
- Place of birth: Windy Nook, England
- Date of death: 1970 (aged 71–72)
- Position: Inside forward

Senior career*
Years	Team	Apps	(Gls)
1920–1921	Preston Colliery		
1921–1923	Crystal Palace	16	(3)
1924	Hartlepools United	0	(0)
Total		16	(3)
- * Club domestic league appearances and goals

Norman Waite (15 February 1898 – 1970) was an English footballer who played in the Football League for Crystal Palace.
