= Colin Holt (footballer) =

Australian rules footballer (1934–2018)

Personal information
- Full name: Colin Francis Holt
- Born: 27 April 1934
- Died: 3 November 2018 (aged 84)
- Original team: Brunswick
- Height: 175 cm (5 ft 9 in)
- Weight: 79 kg (174 lb)

Playing career^{1}
Years	Club	Games (Goals)
1955–57	Carlton	20 (0)
1958–59	Richmond	21 (2)
Total		41 (2)
- ^{1} Playing statistics correct to the end of 1959.

Colin Francis Holt (27 April 1934 – 3 November 2018) was an Australian rules footballer who played with Carlton and Richmond in the Victorian Football League (VFL).

On 3 November 2018, Holt died aged 84.
