= White Death (film) =

- Directed by: Edwin G. Bowen
- Written by: Frank Harvey
- Produced by: Edwin G. Bowen
- Starring: Zane Grey; Alfred Frith
- Cinematography: Arthur Higgins; H.C. Anderson
- Edited by: Edwin G. Bowen; William Carty
- Music by: Isador Goodman
- Production company: Barrier Reef Films
- Distributed by: British Empire Films (Australia); MGM (UK)
- Release dates: October 1936 (Australia); 1937 (UK)
- Running time: 81 minutes
- Country: Australia
- Language: English

White Death is a 1936 Australian film directed by Edwin G. Bowen and starring Zane Grey as himself. He filmed it during a fishing expedition to Australia and it marked the first time he had played a leading role in a film.

== Synopsis ==
Zane Grey bets he can catch a fish bigger than one he sees at Watsons Bay. He hears about a large shark, nicknamed "white death", terrorising the Queensland coast and goes to catch it. He is thwarted by the comic attempts of Newton Smith, a representative of the Wallanga Branch of Fish Protectors, to persuade Grey not to harm fish. There is also a romance between two young people. Eventually Grey manages to catch the shark.

== Cast ==
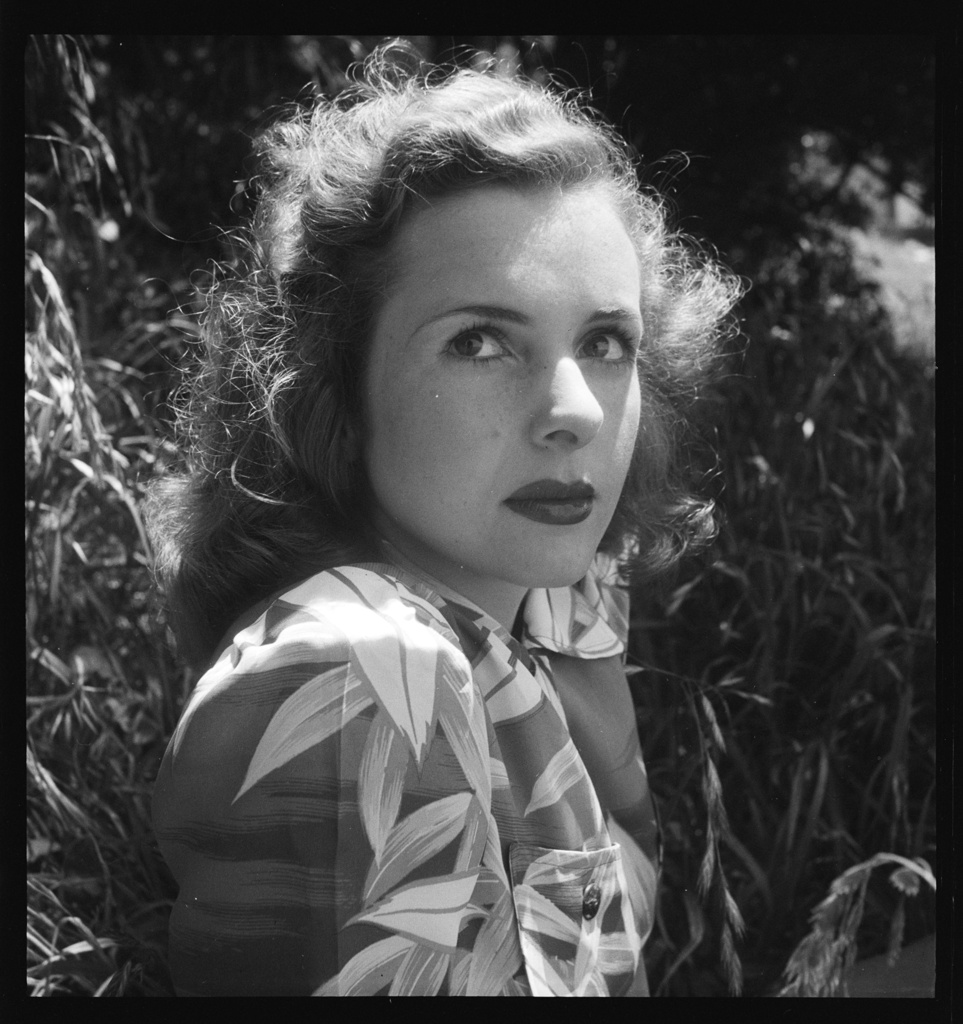
Nola Warren c. 1936

- Zane Grey as himself
- Alfred Frith as Newton Smith
- Nola Warren as Nola Murchinson
- Harold Colonna as David Murchison
- John Weston as John Lollard
- James Coleman as Professor Lollard
- Peter Williams as boatman
- Frank Big Belt as guard

== Production ==
In 1935-36 Zane Grey made a fishing expedition to Australia. This trip was extensively covered by the local media and Grey was often accompanied on his sea voyages by three cameramen he had brought out from America, including H.C. Anderson. Grey's activities were criticised at the time by the Royal Society for the Prevention of Cruelty to Animals.

Barrier Reef Productions, a production company capitalised at £15,000, was formed in 1936 to make the film.

The story was inspired by Grey seeing a great white shark (which he nicknamed "white death") being captured near Bermagui in New South Wales. Frank Harvey was hired to write the screenplay. The story drew on Grey's real-life experiences with the character of Newton Smith sending up his treatment at the hands of the RSPCA.

The majority of the film crew came from Cinesound Productions, who also lent equipment to the production. Grey's manager, Edwin G. Bowen, was appointed director of the movie, although he had limited experience behind the camera.

=== Casting ===
Alfred Frith, a stage comedian, was hired to play the lead opposite Grey. Nola Warren, a 17-year-old from Watsons Bay, with no prior film experience, was cast as the female lead. She performed most of her scenes opposite John Weston, a former schoolboy athletics champion turned radio broadcaster. Aboriginal extras, some of whom had recently appeared in Uncivilised (1936), were brought in from Palm Island, Queensland. Harold Colonna, who played the villain, was best known as an opera singer.

=== Shooting ===
Filming started in May 1936 and took place in the Great Barrier Reef, principally at Hayman Island.

A shark enclosure was built at Hayman to shoot footage using captured sharks.

Bad weather made the shoot difficult. A member of the camera crew sprinkled oil in the surf, hoping it would make it sound less loud. A petrol lamp blew up in John Weston's face. In addition, finding white sharks proved difficult, forcing the props master to construct an artificial one from wood and canvas.

Both Bowen and Frith were accompanied by their wives, who assisted in making the movie, and Bowen's young children, Buddy and Barbara.

Location shooting ended in July 1936 and the rest of the film was made at the Cinesound studios in Sydney.

== Reception ==
Grey left Australia on 19 August claiming it was the greatest country he had visited. He reportedly offered Nola Warren a film contract and announced he would return in 1938 to make another film. Grey did return to Australia in 1939 to fish, shortly before his death, but no further films resulted. In 1937, he published An American Angler in Australia.

The film premiered in October at Moruya and Bateman's Bay, and reached Sydney cinemas in November. The critic for The Sydney Morning Herald described it as "a rambling and rather ramshackle film... the script... is almost bare of dramatic action." Variety called it a "pretty weak effort all around and not likely to make very much... word-of-mouth will do much tolower big b.o. take. Zane Grey is, no doubt, still a good writer of horse operas, but he will not set the world afire in this, his first acting assignment. Scribbler appears to take the whole affair in the nature of a vacation and does not attempt any emoting."

The film was released in the UK but does not appear to have been screened commercially in the US.

Barrier Reef Films announced plans to make further feature films, including one revolving around Alfred Firth, but that did not eventuate.

Nola Warren later became a model and was involved in a scandalous divorce case in 1943. Filmink argued the cast of the movie "seems to have been slightly cursed": Coleman and Colonnna died in 1937, Grey in 1939, John Weston in a plane crash in 1940.

Grey's son Warren later wrote "the movie was so poorly made that it was a financial failure but it is certainly worth viewing as a curiosity and an example of the kind of pioneer filmmaking ZG indulged in."

Filmink called it:

Not a very good film. The basic idea is fantastic... But we don’t see any terrorising or even much of the shark, we just get a lot of fishing, and boats, and Alfred Frith...The acting from the middle-aged performers is dreadful... There’s not even that much shark action in it.... [However] The film looks terrific: most of it was shot on location (Hamilton Island, Great Barrier Reef, etc) and those locations are splendid. The young lovers, Nola Warren and John Weston, are charming and attractive... And there is something endearing about the sheer oddness of the movie.

== Bibliography ==
- Hastrich, Vicki (2025). The Last Days of Zane Grey (Softcover). Sydney: Allen & Unwin. ISBN 9781761471452.
- Reade, Eric (1979). History and heartburn: the saga of Australian film, 1896-1978 (Hardcover). Sydney: Harper & Row. ISBN 9780063120334.
