= 1938 Interstate Grand Prix =

Australian motor race staged in 1938

The 1938 Interstate Grand Prix was a motor race staged at the Wirlinga circuit, near Albury, in New South Wales, Australia on 19 March 1938. The race, which was the first Interstate Grand Prix, was contested on a handicap basis over 34 laps, a distance of 148.5 miles. It was organised by the Victorian Sporting Car Club and was held in conjunction with the 150th celebrations at Albury.

The race was won by Jack Phillips of Wangaratta, driving a Ford V8 Special. Phillips also recorded the fastest race time.

== Race results ==
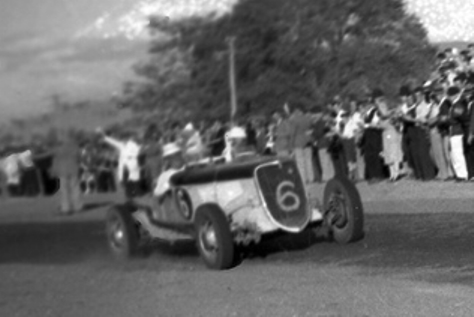
The Ford V8 Special of race winner Jack Phillips

Position	Driver	No.	Car	Entrant	Handicap	Time
1	Jack Phillips	6	Ford V8 Special	J. Phillips	6:00	2:13:15
2	George Bonser	5	Terraplane	G. Bonser	5:30	2:17:33
3	Les Burrows	9	Terraplane	L. Burrows	8:00	2:21:33
4	G. Winton	11	AC	G. Winton	9:00	2:26:16
5	G. Dentry	10	Riley	G. Dentry	8:15	2:27:10
6	A. Beasley	23	Singer	A. Beasley	20:00	2:44:33
7	C. A. Williamson	12	Chrysler	C. A. Williamson	9:15	2:29:19
8	J. O'Dea	16	MG P	J. O'Dea	16:00	
?	G. M. Joshua	3	Frazer Nash	G. M. Joshua	2:00	
?	Alan Gittings	20	Bugatti	M. Thomas	17:00	
?	T. Macknamara	21	Bugatti	T. Macknamara	17:15	
?	G. A. Cowper	25	Morris	G. A. Cowper	25:00	
DNF	K. R. McDonald	24	Standard	K. R. McDonald	22:00	23 laps
DNF	A. Barrett	22	Morris Special	A. Barrett	18:30	
DNF	C. A. Dunne	19	MG P	D. Sowter	16:15	
DNF	A. Aitken	17	Riley	A. Aitken	15:15	
DNF	Jim Boughton	16	Morgan 4/4	J. Boughton	15:00	
DNF	R. G. Wigley	15	MG Magnette	R. G. Wigley	12:00	
DNF	R. A. Lea Wright	8	Terraplane	R. A. Lea Wright	7:30	
DNF	H. J. Beith	7	Terraplane	H. J. Beith	7:15	
DNF	H. Bartlett	4	MG Q	H. Bartlett	5:00	
DNF	Frank Klienig	2	Hudson	W. A. MacIntyre	1:00	
DNF	L. Evans	14	Vauxhall	L. Evans	9:30	2 laps
DNS	A. G. Sinclair	1	Alta	A. G. Sinclair	Scratch	

=== Notes ===
- Race distance: 148.5 miles
- Entries in Official Programme: 24
- Starters: 23
- Finishers: 12
- Fastest Time: Jack Phillips (Ford V8 Special), 2:13:15, 67.5 mph
- Teams Prize: Burrows, Bonser & Kieinig

== Race name ==
Some sources refer to this race as the Albury Grand Prix. The Official Programme uses the name Interstate Grand Prix on the front cover but uses Albury Grand Prix for the list of Handicaps and Numbers.

== See also ==
- 1936 Victorian Sporting Car Club Trophy
