= Alfred Frith =

Australian actor

Alfred Frith (1885–1941) was a British-born stage comedian who worked extensively in India and Africa before settling in Australia. He often worked for J. C. Williamson Ltd and appeared opposite Zane Grey in the film White Death (1936). He served in the Boer War.
