= Arthur Hurst (footballer) =

Australian rules footballer

Personal information
- Full name: Arthur Ronald Hurst
- Born: 13 July 1931
- Died: 20 August 2014 (aged 83)
- Height: 175 cm (5 ft 9 in)
- Weight: 70 kg (154 lb)
- Position: Wing

Playing career^{1}
Years	Club	Games (Goals)
1951–1955	St Kilda	42 (10)
- ^{1} Playing statistics correct to the end of 1955.

Arthur Ronald Hurst (13 July 1931 – 20 August 2014) was an Australian rules footballer who played for the St Kilda Football Club in the Victorian Football League (VFL).
