= Charles Chewings =

Australian geologist and anthropologist (1859–1937)

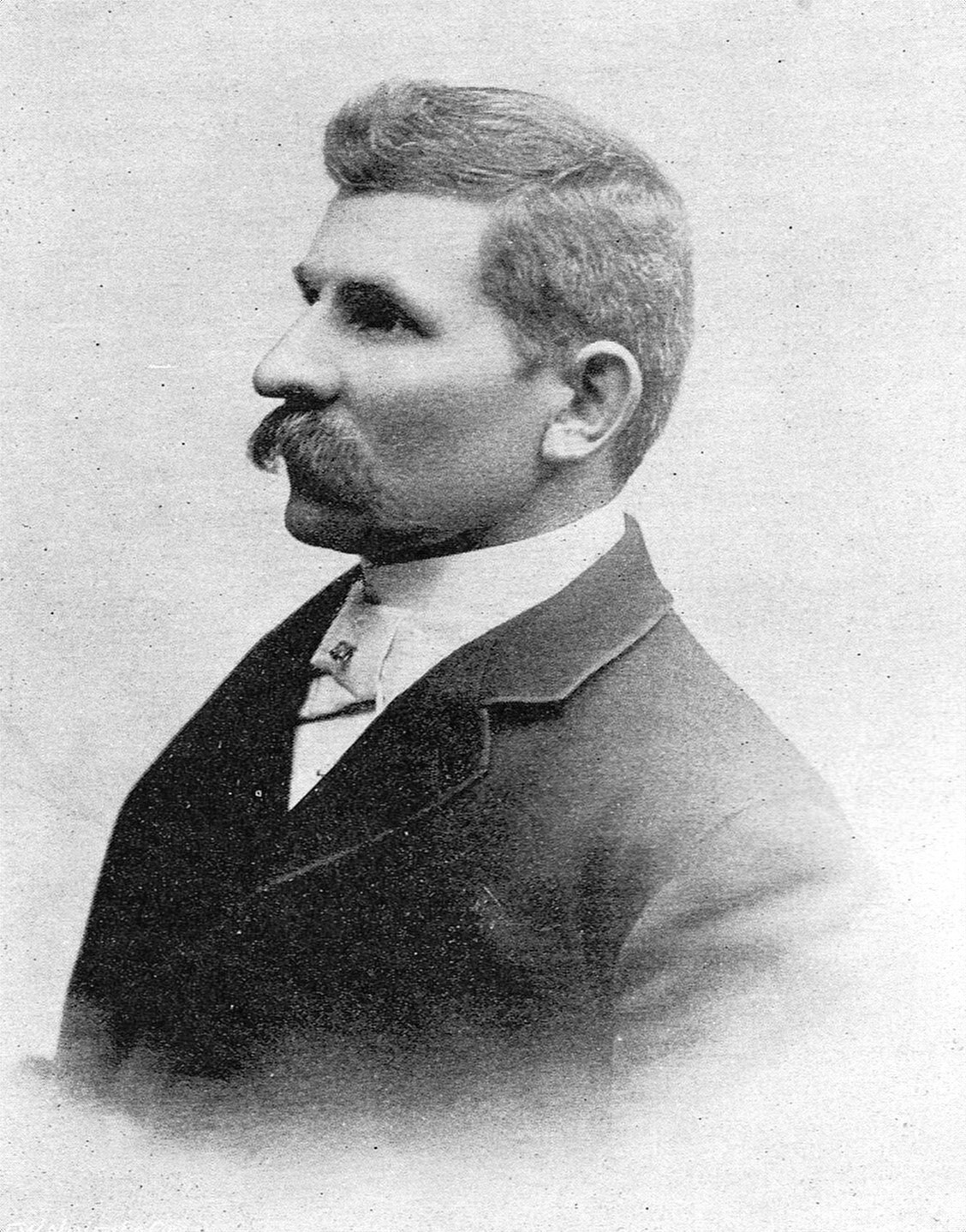
Charles Chewings

Charles Chewings (16 April 1859 – 9 June 1937) was an Australian geologist and anthropologist.

== Early life ==
Charles Chewings was born as a son of John Chewings, a pastoralist, and his wife Sarah (née Wall) at Woorkongoree station, near Burra, South Australia. Chewings married Miss F. M. Braddock in 1887.

== Career ==
Chewings went to Europe in 1888 and studied geology at University College London and University of Heidelberg. After returning to Australia, Chewings worked in Western Australia reporting on mines before returning to South Australia to resume camel carrying.
