= Rosemary Adey =

Australian softball player and sports administrator

Rosemary Kathleen Adey, OAM
- Born: 29 January 1933; South Australia
- Died: 1 October 2013 (aged 80); South Australia
- Known for: Softball, Sports Administralion

Rosemary Adey OAM (29 January 1933 – 1 October 2013) was an Australian softball player and sports administrator.

Adey represented both Australia and South Australia in Softball where she was vice-captain of the SA Open Women's Softball Team (1955–56), Captain (1957–60), and coach (1961–63). She was selected in a secondary Australian Squad as captain in 1953 and debuted internationally in 1954 during a test series against New Zealand and was selected in the Australian team to play South Africa in 1960. Her onfield specialisation was at 1st base and she played a crucial role as a powerful batter.

After her playing days, Adey continued to contribute to Softball by acting as Softball SA Treasurer, Vice President and President, Softball Australia-Vice President and President and internationally as International Softball Federation-Vice President. In November 2001, she retired her position on the ISF Board after 51 years of service. Softball Australia named an annually awarded medal, "The Rookie of the Year", in her honour.

== Death ==
She died in Adelaide, South Australia on 1 October 2013, aged 80, following a long illness.

== Honours ==
- South Australia Sportswoman of the year 1957
- Softball SA Life Member 1976
- Medal of the Order of Australia (OAM) 1987
- Softball Australia Life Member 1989
- Softball Australia Hall of Fame 1991
- International Softball Federation Hall of Fame 1997
- Softball SA Hall of Fame 2009
