= Thomas Brentnall =

Thomas Brentnall (30 December 1846 – 10 July 1937) was an English-born chartered accountant who was the first president of the Institute of Chartered Accountants in Australia.

== Early life and background ==
He was the nephew of Thomas Brentnall, the 9th Mayor of Middlesbrough (1862).

== Accountancy in Australia ==
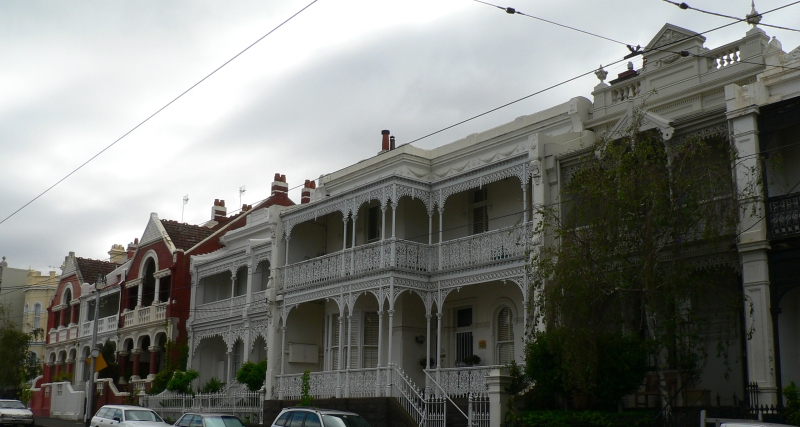
Brentnall lived in South Yarra, Victoria

His successful business evolved with several names, Brentnall & Riley, Brentnall, Norton & Co., and Brentnall, Mewton & Butler. From 1880, he lived at Newnham, Caroline Street, in South Yarra.

== Other interests ==
Brentnall was a keen musician and most notably a violinist and often performed in Melbourne.

== Death ==
His wife, Caroline Brentnall (née Crossley) died in 1909.

== Bibliography ==
- A. D. Ellis, The History of the Royal Melbourne Golf Club (Melbourne, 1941); Chartered Accountant in Australia, July 1937; Argus (Melbourne), 30 December 1935; Sun-News Pictorial (Melbourne), 12 July 1937.

== External links and sources ==
- Australian Dictionary of Biography
