= Ernest Clark (civil servant) =

British colonial administrator

Sir Ernest Clark GCMG, KCB, CBE
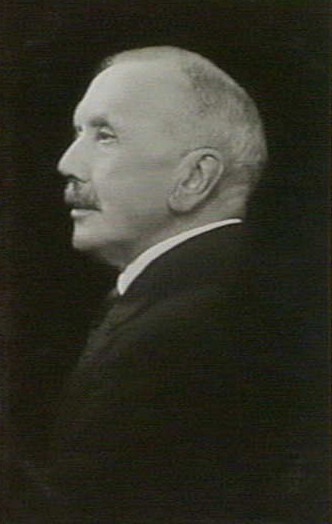

15th Governor of Tasmania
- In office 4 August 1933 – 4 August 1945
- Monarchs: George V Edward VIII; George VI
- Premier: John McPhee; Walter Lee; Albert Ogilvie; Edmund Dwyer-Gray; Robert Cosgrove
- Preceded by: Sir James O'Grady
- Succeeded by: Sir Hugh Binney

Personal details
- Born: 13 April 1864 Plumstead, Kent, England
- Died: 26 August 1951 (aged 87) Seaton, Devon, England
- Resting place: Cornelian Bay, Tasmania
- Spouse(s): Mary Winkfield (1899–1944); Harriet Jessie Constance McLennan (1947–51)

Sir Ernest Clark, GCMG, KCB, CBE (13 April 1864 – 26 August 1951) was a British civil servant who served as Governor of Tasmania from 1933 to 1945.

== Early life and education ==
Ernest Clark was born on 13 April 1864 in Plumstead, Kent to teacher Samuel Henry Clark, and his wife Ann Leaver. He was educated at King's College London, and entered the civil service in 1881, working for HM Treasury.

== Civil service ==
Clark was called to the bar at Middle Temple in 1894, and joined the Treasury's legal staff. In 1904, he had his first experience managing colonial finances when he was seconded to the Cape Colony in Africa to establish the colony's taxation procedures, subsequently serving the government of the Union of South Africa.

When the First World War broke out, Clark worked as a Treasury liaison officer with the War Office and the Ministry of Munitions. After the war, he was appointed a Commander of the Order of the British Empire in the 1918 Birthday Honours, and joined the Board of Inland Revenue as assistant secretary and deputy inspector of taxes. He was knighted in the 1920 Birthday Honours.

=== Creation of Northern Ireland Civil Service ===
From 1920, Clark was appointed to Northern Ireland as assistant under-secretary – the equal in the six counties to Sir John Anderson, the head of the Dublin Castle administration – and was instrumental in resolving amicable relations between Northern Ireland and the newly formed Irish Free State. He was described by Sir Basil Brooke, 1st Viscount Brookeborough as 'the midwife' of Northern Ireland.

His friendship with James Hamilton, 3rd Duke of Abercorn, the Governor of Northern Ireland, also eased relations between the new Irish government and Downing Street. Clark was appointed a Knight Commander of the Order of the Bath (KCB) in the 1924 Birthday Honours.

== Governor of Tasmania ==
Clark visited Australia in 1928, as a member of a British government economic delegation tasked with examining the state of the Australian economy. His report on Australian economics greatly impressed the Premier of Tasmania, Joseph Lyons, and it was believed that Lyons (by then prime minister) may have suggested Clark for the post of Governor of Tasmania in 1933. The post had been vacant since 1930 due to lack of funds, and Clark's appointment, with his background in finance and contacts in London business may aid both Tasmania and Australia.

Clark's term as governor was extended three times due to the Second World War. He was popular in Tasmania, especially because of his visits to all parts of the state, encouraging morale during the war. He was given the rare honour of a Knight Grand Cross of the Order of St Michael and St George at the end of hostilities.

Clark was a freemason. During his term as governor, he was also Grand Master of the Grand Lodge of Tasmania.

Clark returned to England in 1945, where he married his second wife Harriet McLennan in 1947. He died on 26 August 1951 at his home in Seaton, Devon, and his remains were shipped to Tasmania for interment at Cornelian Bay Cemetery.

Government offices
Preceded by Sir James O'Grady	Governor of Tasmania; 1933–1945	Succeeded by Sir Hugh Binney
