= McDonagh Productions =

McDonagh Productions was a short-lived Australian production company that produced feature and short films. It was run by the McDonagh sisters, Phyllis, Isabel and Paulette. The company eventually went broke after the failure of its last two features.

== Filmography ==
- Those Who Love (1926)
- The Far Paradise (1928)
- The Cheaters (1930)
- Australia in the Swim (1931) - documentary
- How I Play Cricket (1931) - documentary
- The Mighty Conqueror (1932) - documentary
- The Trail of the Roo (1932) - documentary
- Two Minutes Silence (1933)
