= McKirdy =

McKirdy is a surname. Notable people with the surname include:

- Arch McKirdy (1924–2013), Australian radio broadcaster
- Ed McKirdy, American musician
- Harry McKirdy (born 1997), English footballer
- Lewis McKirdy, Australian radio announcer
- Sean McKirdy (born 1998), Scottish footballer
