= William Carter (actor) =

Australian actor

- Born: 1902; Albury, New South Wales
- Died: 1952 (aged 49–50); Newtown, New South Wales
- Education: Newington College
- Occupation: Actor
- Spouse: Kathlyn (née Sands)
- Children: One son
- Parents: William Thomas Carter (father); Alice Mary (née Gardiner) (mother)

William George Carter (1902–1952) was an Australian actor whose early acting career was in silent films.

== Birth and education ==
Carter was born in Albury, New South Wales, the only child of Alice May (née Gardiner) and William Thomas Carter. He attended Newington College commencing aged 12 in 1913 and under the headship of the Rev Dr Charles Prescott.

== Those Who Love ==
He worked in collaboration with sisters Paulette McDonagh, Phyllis McDonagh and Marie Lorraine on Those Who Love, a 1926 silent film. The movie is about the son of a knight, Barry Manton played by Carter, who falls in love with a dancer. The father disapproves and bribes the dancer to disappear. Hurt, Barry leaves home and becomes a labourer on the docks. He meets poor but honest Lola Quayle, played by Marie Lorraine in a cabaret and offers her a place to live after she resists the advances of a pub owner. They stay in separate rooms but fall in love during a storm and he later marries her. Barry's father wants him to return home and sends a solicitor over to approach him. Not wanting to get between Barry and his family, Lola runs away. Years later, Barry lives in an attic, having rejected wealth and position and taken to drink, while Lola works as a nurse, looking after their son. Barry is injured and Lola recognises him at hospital. She visits Sir James Maitland and asks for money for a specialist and the family is united. Only part of the film survives today and it is held by the National Film and Sound Archive.

== Later life ==
On 14 March 1928, Carter married Kathlyn Winifred Sands in Rockdale, New South Wales. Carter petitioned for a divorce from Kathlyn on the grounds of desertion in the December of that year. The marriage produced a son, William Graham Carter, in the same year. Carter became a company director, working in Sydney, and lived at Westbank House, a substantial estate and orchard on the Nepean River in Emu Plains, New South Wales. He died at Royal Prince Alfred Hospital in May 1952.

== Select filmography ==
- Those Who Love (1926)
- Here's the gang (1935)
- Alpine Rendezvous (1936)
