= I've Always Loved You =

1946 film by Frank Borzage

- Directed by: Frank Borzage
- Screenplay by: Borden Chase
- Based on: story Concerto by Borden Chase
- Produced by: Frank Borzage
- Starring: Philip Dorn; Catherine McLeod; William Carter; Maria Ouspenskaya; Felix Bressart; Elizabeth Patterson
- Cinematography: Tony Gaudio
- Edited by: Richard L. Van Enger
- Music by: Walter Scharf
- Color process: Technicolor
- Production company: Republic Pictures
- Distributed by: Republic Pictures
- Release date: September 6, 1946 (New York)
- Running time: 117 minutes
- Country: United States
- Language: English
- Budget: $1.5-2 million or $1,954,325

I've Always Loved You is a 1946 American drama musical film produced and directed by Frank Borzage and starring Philip Dorn, Catherine McLeod, William Carter, Maria Ouspenskaya, Felix Bressart and Elizabeth Patterson.

The screenplay is based on Borden Chase's magazine story "Concerto", based on the career of his first wife. The film was originally titled Concerto and was the most expensive film ever produced by Republic Pictures. In unusual fashion for a Republic film, I've Always Loved You is a high-budget prestige production with an A-list director in Borzage.

== Plot ==
Concert maestro and famous pianist Leopold Goronoff takes Myra Hassman, daughter of the legendary pianist Frederick Hassman, as his protege. Myra is a country girl who plays Rachmaninoff beautifully on the piano. Despite the wishes of farmer George Sampter, who loves Myra, Leopold takes Myra to New York and they fall in love. However, Leopold is habitually unfaithful and domineering while Myra, who calls him Maestro, tries to serve and learn from him. Leopold belittles Myra by asserting that there is no place for women in music.

Leopold arranges for Myra to perform at Carnegie Hall and conducts the orchestra while she plays Rachmaninoff. However, Myra plays the piece forcefully and Leopold looks at her scornfully. She rushes off the stage and Leopold confronts her, enraged that she would attempt to surpass his skill level by imitating his style in such a brash manner. After Myra leaves, Leopold's mother Madame Goronoff tells him that Myra is indeed the superior pianist.

Myra returns to her country home and finds that she can connect with Leopold over the great distance through the piano. However, she reconnects with George, who professes his love for her. Despite her lingering feelings for Leopold, Myra agrees to marry George.

Time passes and Myra and George have a young daughter named Porgy, but Myra is unhappy and is thinking of Leopold. In New York, Leopold tells Madame Goronoff that he desperately misses and loves Myra, but she tells him that his true mistress is music. Just before she dies, she warns Leopold not to pursue Myra, and he agrees. George confronts Myra and knows that she is thinking of Leopold. Myra is conflicted but determined to preserve her blessings.

Many years pass and Porgy is a young woman who has inherited her mother's talent. George introduces Myra to professor Michael Severin, who takes Porgy to New York to launch her career. Myra is worried that Porgy's piano playing lacks feeling and might cause her to fail in her Carnegie Hall debut. George urges that Myra seek Leopold for his opinion, but Myra senses that George's desire is that she confront her lingering feelings by reuniting with Leopold. Myra and Porgy visit Leopold, who approves of Porgy's playing but asks Myra why she chose her life with George.

At Carnegie Hall, Myra is announced as the featured pianist in place of her daughter. She delivers a command performance, after which Leopold admits that he was wrong about a woman's place in music and Myra professes her love for George now that she no longer has lingering doubts.

== Cast ==
- Philip Dorn as Leopold Goronoff
- Catherine McLeod as Myra Hassman
- Bill Carter as George Sampter
- Maria Ouspenskaya as Madame Goronoff
- Felix Bressart as Frederick Hassman
- Elizabeth Patterson as Mrs. Sampter
- Vanessa Brown as Georgette 'Porgy' Sampter at 17
- Lewis Howard as Michael Severin
- Adele Mara as Señorita Fortaleza
- Gloria Donovan as Porgy at 5
- Stephanie Bachelor as Redhead
- Cora Witherspoon as Edwina Blythe
- Fritz Feld as Nicholas Kavlun
- Andre Previn as “Longhair” auditioner (uncredited)

== Reception ==
In a contemporary review for The New York Times, critic Bosley Crowther called I've Always Loved You a "silly, mawkish film" and wrote: "In short, it is one of those pictures which takes on a terribly phoney air about the rapturous realms of music and the beauty of simple, home-grown love. (Why protest that, in the story, there is a hopeless confusion of ideals?)"

== Radio adaptation ==
I've Always Loved You was presented on Lux Radio Theatre on November 4, 1946, starring Joseph Cotten and Catherine McLeod.

== Restoration ==
A restoration of I've Always Loved You by Paramount Pictures, the Film Foundation and Martin Scorsese screened at the Museum of Modern Art on February 10, 2018 as part of the museum's program of showcasing 30 restored films from the library of Republic Pictures, curated by Scorsese.
