= Sinara =

Sinara may refer to:

- Sinara Group, a Russian investment company
  - Sinara Transport Machines, a Russian vehicle manufacturing and engineering company
- Sinara (Marvel Cinematic Universe), a character in Agents of S.H.I.E.L.D.
- Sinara River, a tributary of the Iset River in Russia
- Sinara (given name), an Arabic and Greek feminine given name

== See also ==
- Senara (disambiguation)
- Cynara (disambiguation)
- Synara San, a character in the animated television series Star Wars Resistance
