= Commonwealth Government Film Competition =

The Commonwealth Government Film Competition is a film competition held by the Australian Federal Government in the 1930s to judge the Best Australian film and best scenario. They were an early example of Australian film awards.

== 1930 Competition ==
The competition was first announced in 1929 and held in 1930. It offered a prize of £5,000 for the best film made between January 1, 1929, and March 31, 1930. Second prize was £2,500 and third prize £1,500.

There was criticism about the level of government co ordination with the industry with regards to the competition.

Four films were entered: Fellers, The Cheaters, Tiger Island and The Nation of Tomorrow.

The makers of Fellers argued that their film had been given enough prints under the judging system to warrant the second prize of £2,500 and threatened to sue, but the government did not change its mind.

=== Winners ===
The only film given an award was Fellers which was only granted third prize. No film was considered good enough for first or second prize. The Cheaters was voted fourth, Tiger Island fifth and Nation of Tomorrow sixth (even though there had only been four entries.)

== 1935 Competition ==
=== Conditions of Entry ===
The conditions of the film competition included that films should be produced in the Commonwealth, that 76 per cent, of the scenes should be "shot" in the Commonwealth or its territories, that the capital employed in the production of films should be substantially British, and that about 50 per cent, of the acting and the work of production should be carried out by British subjects, who had lived for the previous two years in the Commonwealth.

Entrants in the scenario competition had to be British subjects, who had lived in the Commonwealth or its territories since July 1, 1933, and that scenarios must have been written in the Commonwealth since that date.

Eleven films were entered. The judges were General I. C. Mackay, Beatrice Tildesley, and Kenneth Wilkinson.

=== Winners ===
- First prize (£2500) - Heritage - 70 points
- Second prize (£1250) - The Silence of Dean Maitland - 63 points
- Third prize (£750) - Clara Gibbings - 60 points

=== Scenario Competition ===
Judges were Professor S. H. Cowling, Irene Webb and Frank Clellow.

- Best feature sound cinematograph film scenario (£250) - Edgar Robin and James Gullan, for "Vendetta," *Best feature sound cinematograph film scenario containing Australian sentiment (£250) - Frederick Howard and Hermon Gill, for "Faithful Journey."
