= John Faulkner (actor) =

- Born: 13 July 1872; Ashby-de-la-Zouch, Leicestershire, England, U.K.
- Died: 13 September 1934 (aged 62); Manly, New South Wales Australia
- Occupation: Actor

John Faulkner (13 July 1872 – 13 September 1934) was a British-Australian inventor and actor of theatre and film. He appeared in two early vehicles for sports star Snowy Baker, The Enemy Within (1918), and The Lure of the Bush (1918), as well as movies from directors Raymond Longford, Franklyn Barrett, Paulette McDonagh, and Beaumont Smith.

== Biography ==
=== Early life ===
Faulkner was born in Ashby-de-la-Zouch, Leicestershire, England, the 7th of twelve children. He was a descendant of Warren Hastings, the first Governor General of Bengal. When he was 13 he was sent to live with relatives in Ontario, Canada. In 1893 he returned to England and worked for several years as a traveller for a brewery. He befriended a young Oscar Asche and the two of them travelled the English countryside selling a fridge that Faulkner had invented. In the early 1900s he was a drinking companion to John Barrymore.

He started to act, formed his own theatre company and toured South America and North America. While in New York he received an offer to act opposite Ethel Barrymore but turned it down to return to England, where he started making films. He continued to make money on the side by inventing things, such as an elastic-sided shoe. A meeting with Roy Redgrave who had just toured Australia successfully prompted him to move to that country in 1914. He settled in Australia for the next few years, apart from a 1916 visit to Hollywood where he befriended Charlie Chaplin.

=== Film career ===
Faulkner began acting in Australian silent films, starting with The Enemy Within (1918). Historian Graham Shirley wrote that "as an actor, his most distinctive roles were those of the refined heavy, but he also played a gallery of indulgent or put-upon fathers. His appearance was more suited to the villains than fathers."

He lived in England for a few years in the 1920s before returning to Australia in 1924. He produced a documentary about a kangaroo cull, On the Trail of the Kangaroo (1925), and acted in two films for the McDonagh sisters, The Far Paradise (1928) and The Cheaters (1930). Faulkner's work in silent film impressed executives at MGM in Hollywood and they offered him a contract, but it was conditional on a medical test and by that stage he had had two strokes and his blood pressure was high.

Faulkner married twice, the second time to dancer Sheila Whytock, and became a father at a late age to a son, the future actor Trader Faulkner. Trader later claimed that his father started drinking heavily from 1932 onwards and suffered major financial difficulties. He made and sold his own whiskey at home to earn some extra money.

=== Death ===
Faulkner suffered a third stroke on 13 September 1934 and died six days later in the Manly District Hospital. His son later wrote that "the family were relieved he had gone, except for me." He added that, "My father's friends later told me that he was a brilliant raconteur and wit, and a wonderful companion. His genius - like that of his old friend Jack Barrymore - had evidently flourished in the bar. If there was tragedy in his life, it was neglect. He was pushed out to fend for himself when he was just 13. Between then and his marriage, he acquired enormous talent, but had no family life, no purpose, no discipline. Like those he helped in Australian films, he had to learn as he went along."

== Filmography ==
- The Enemy Within (1918)
- £500 Reward (1918)
- The Lure of the Bush (1918)
- The Breaking of the Drought (1918)
- The Man from Snowy River (1920)
- Silks and Saddles (1921)
- The Blue Mountains Mystery (1921)
- Birth of New Zealand (1921)
- On the Trail of the Kangaroo (1925) - documentary, producer only
- Peter Vernon's Silence (1926)
- The Far Paradise (1928)
- Odds On (1928)
- The Kingdom of Twilight (1929) a.k.a. Tanami
- The Cheaters (1930)
