= Phyllis Barry =

English actress (1908–1954)

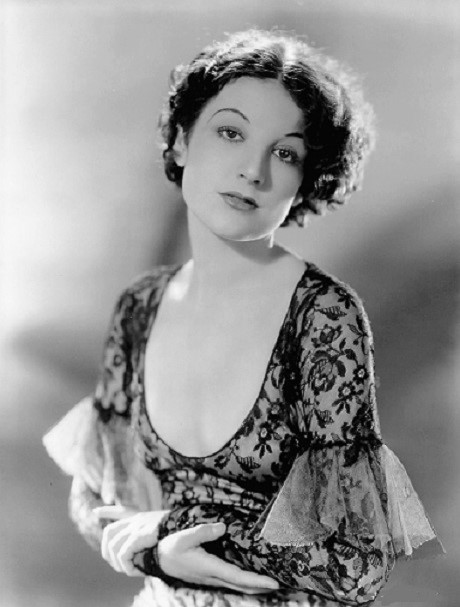
- Barry in 1932
- Born: Gertrude Phyllis Hillyard; December 7, 1908; Leeds, West Riding of Yorkshire, England
- Died: July 1, 1954 (aged 45); Los Angeles, California, U.S.
- Occupation: Actress
- Years active: 1923–1947
- Spouses: Abner Nordlund (m. 1932; div. 1934): Gilbert M. Caldwell (m. 19??)

Phyllis Barry (born Gertrude Phyllis Hillyard; December 7, 1908 – July 1, 1954) was an English film actress. Born in Leeds, West Riding of Yorkshire, England, to Seth Henry and Bertha (née Giles) Hillyard, Barry appeared in over 40 films between 1925 and 1947.

== Career ==
Barry trained as a dancer in a John Tiller troupe. In August 1923, when she was 12, her mother brought her to Australia, where she was known as Phyllis du Barry. By September, she was the lead dancer in a cabaret troupe at the Wentworth Cafe, until May 1925, when she made her first film, Painted Daughters. Engagements followed with the Frances Scully Pony Ballet and as a dancer at the Ambassadors' Club. In July 1926, she joined the Fuller Brothers, touring with Chefalo and Palmer, the Moon and Morris Revue Company and the Zig Zag Revue Company. Her second film, Sunrise, was made in 1926. In 1927, she appeared as a specialty dancer in the musicals No, No, Nanette and Gershwin's Lady Be Good, both starring Elsie Prince. She then joined the Jim Gerald Revue Company.

Her mother was an accomplished dress designer, both for the Empire Theatre in Sydney and on her own account, under the name "Madame du Barry." In February 1928, her mother married Jim Gerald's brother, Lance Vane. In March, Phyllis accompanied her newly acquired uncle and aunt, Jim Gerald and Essie Jennings, on an extensive tour of America, returning in November. On her return, Phyllis remained with Jim Gerald's company, then other Fullers' companies, until April 1929, when she joined the cast of Rio Rita, starring Gladys Moncrieff, as a dancer.

In March 1930, Phyllis went to America and, under the name of Phyllis du Barry, toured the coast with the Fanchon and Marco Company. After arriving in Hollywood, she was given a film part when director King Vidor selected Barry to co-star as "the other woman" in the 1932 Samuel Goldwyn film Cynara opposite Ronald Colman and Kay Francis.

Phyllis Barry enjoyed a brief vogue as an exotic foil for movie comedians. In 1933 she starred alongside Buster Keaton and Jimmy Durante in the comedy What! No Beer? for MGM, and opposite Wheeler & Woolsey in Diplomaniacs for RKO Radio. She reunited with Wheeler & Woolsey the next year in Hips, Hips, Hooray!

Her fortunes fell after 1934, when she was no longer signed for co-starring or featured roles. She began accepting small character roles in British-themed features, such as Bonnie Scotland (with Laurel & Hardy, although she shared no scenes with the stars), The Prince and the Pauper, Bulldog Drummond Comes Back, and Step Lively, Jeeves! She also worked in less prestigious short subjects. She actually starred in a single Hal Roach comedy short, The Infernal Triangle, and worked in Columbia's two-reel comedies with Charley Chase and The Three Stooges. (Modern viewers will remember Barry as the international spy who seduces Curly Howard in Three Little Sew and Sews.)

== Personal life ==
Phyllis Barry married vaudevillian Abner Nordlund in March 1932, divorcing him in April 1934. Shortly thereafter she married painter/decorator Gilbert M. Caldwell, living in West Hollywood. Her mother had joined her in America in July 1930, and lived with the couple.

== Later career and death ==
Her screen career became more erratic, with less frequent appearances through 1941 (including a couple of lurid exploitation features). Her career never recovered, and she worked in only four films between 1943 and 1947 before leaving the field entirely.

Phyllis Barry committed suicide on July 1, 1954. The official cause of death was barbiturate poisoning induced by the ingestion of phenobarbital.

== Filmography ==
- Painted Daughters (1925) as Saharab
- Sunrise (1926) as Hope Stuart
- Cynara (1932) as Doris Emily Lea
- Blind Adventure (1933) as Gwen
- Diplomaniacs (1933) as Fifi
- Goodbye Love (1933) as Dorothy Blaine
- Marriage on Approval (1933) as Dorothy
- What! No Beer? (1933) as Hortense
- Long Lost Father (1934) as Party guest
- Hips, Hips, Hooray! (1934) as Madame Irene
- Where Sinners Meet (1934) as Brunette Chambermaid
- Love Past Thirty (1934) as Beth Ramsden
- The Moonstone (1934) as Anne Verinder
- Forbidden Heaven (1935) as Sybil Radford
- Bonnie Scotland (1935) as Gossip
- One Rainy Afternoon (1936) as Felice
- To Mary with Love (1937) as Guest
- Step Lively, Jeeves! (1937) as Mrs. Tremaine
- The Prince and the Pauper (1937) as Barmaid
- Damaged Goods (1937) as Margie
- Affairs of Cappy Ricks (1937) as Ellen Ricks Peasely
- Bulldog Drummond Comes Back (1937) as Hortense, barmaid
- The Invisible Menace (1938) as Mrs. Aline Dolman
- Trade Winds (1938) as Ruth
- Three Little Sew and Sews (1939, Short) as Miss Olga Arvin
- The Jones Family in Hollywood (1939) as Actress
- The Witness Vanishes (1939) as Miss Carson
- Kid Nightingale (1939) as First Girl with Mrs. Reynolds
- We Are Not Alone (1939) as First Chorus Girl
- Secrets of a Model (1940) as Sally Adams
- I Was an Adventuress (1940) as Englishwoman at Exhibit
- Waterloo Bridge (1940) as Second Girl at Estate Dance
- The Case of the Black Parrot (1941) as Julia
- Shadows on the Stairs (1941) as Lucy Timson, the Maid
- Gentleman from Dixie (1941) as Secretary
- Unfinished Business (1941) as Sheila
- The Mysterious Doctor (1943) as Ruby
- Frenchman's Creek (1944) as Woman in Gaming House
- Kitty (1945) as Guest
- Love from a Stranger (1947) as Waitress
