= Quartly =

Quartly is a surname. Notable people with the surname include:

- Reg Quartly (1912–1983), British-born Australian comedian
- Rob Quartly, Canadian music video, television, and commercial director
