= Reg Quartly =

Australian comedian

Reg Quartly AM
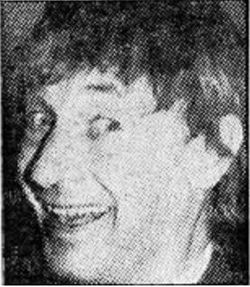
- Born: Reginald Francis Quartly; 19 March 1912; England
- Died: 26 April 1983 (aged 71); Sydney, New South Wales, Australia
- Occupation: Comic actor
- Television: Captain Fortune Show

Reginald Francis Quartly AM (19 March 1912 – 26 April 1983) was an English born Australian comedian who was well-known to Australian audiences for his work on stage, screen, radio and television over a period of "more than 50 years".

== Early life and career ==
Quartly was born in England on 19 March 1912. His parents were Percival Francis and Lydia Elizabeth Quartly. The family emigrated to New Zealand when Reg was aged 10 years old.

He became a professional entertainer and made his first appearance in amateur trials at the Prince Edward Theatre, Auckland at the age of 11, singing "It Ain't Gonna Rain No More", and won the competition prize of 10 shillings. He then appeared for ten weeks in the theatre as a child performer and then made a "successful tour" of New Zealand for two years.

== Theatre and film career in Australia ==
When Quartly was around the age of 16 he moved to Sydney and joined the "big touring musical shows of Sir Benjamin Fuller". He appeared at Fuller's Tivoli Theatre, which was Sydney's top variety theater of the period, and at the Empire Theatre in Haymarket, where in 1928 he appeared in the play Top Hole alongside the vaudevillian Fred Bluett.

In the same year he appeared in the silent film Trooper O'Brien, a melodrama set during the Ned Kelly period. Quartly's role was Moori, an aboriginal child. He then appeared in The Cheaters, a 1930 silent feature film directed by Paulette McDonagh which was later adapted into a partial talkie.

In 1933 Quartly appeared as a comedian in a series of plays at the Tivoli Theatre in Broken Hill in the far west of New South Wales: Walter George's Sunshine Players, Keep Smilin, Leave It At That and Step Lively.

During the Second World War he, along with Tom Newbury and Bob Dyer, entertained Australian, New Zealand and American troops in the war zones of the South Pacific.

During the 1950s he appeared as an actor in musical theatre and pageants of "dance and song" staged in several major Sydney theatres, including Love's a Luxury (1951) and Dick Whittington and His Cat (1951) at the Palace Theatre, and Cinderella (1957), where his role was the Baroness de Bluffe, at the Elizabethan Theatre, Newtown.

== Television and radio ==
With the advent of television in Australia in the 1950s Quartly was one of the actors who regularly contributed to the Captain Fortune Show (also known as Captain Fortune's Saturday Party), a popular children's program which first broadcast on Sydney's ATN-7 in 1957. He appeared there in the role of the clown named "Uncle Reg" or "Uncle Reggie".

From 1962 he worked in ATN-7's Saturday children's program The Town of Make Believe which had "evolved from Captain Fortune’s work" and was compered by Arch McKirdy ("Uncle Mac") "assisted by 'Uncle' Reg Quartly".

Quartly took the lead role when in 1966 The Town of Make Believe was renamed Fun Fair and given a new time slot of 2 pm on Saturday.

He also appeared in the role of Auntie Flo on the ABN-2's Partyland program.

Quartly worked many years as a comic on Sydney radio stations, particularly on 2KY for 30 years and 2UE for 15 years. On Radio 2UW in 1941 he introduced characters and enacted scenes from Charles Dickens's novels in his program Mr. Pickwick Presents. In about the same year he co-wrote the words and music of the song "Chins up high" for voice and piano with ukulele chord diagrams for 2UW.

He appeared in the comedy series Archie in Australia broadcast on ABC radio in 1957.

== Legacy ==
Among his many activities, Quartly played an important role in the early development of children's television in Australia, with Geoff Allen in the Sydney Morning Herald dubbing him a "Pied Piper". In the mid-years of the twentieth century his audiences cut across the generations, with grandparents remembering his appearances in "pantomime, vaudeville and radio" shows and their grandchildren fans of his television shows.

== Personal life ==
Quartly was married to Betty and they had five children and seven grandchildren. They lived for many years in the Sydney suburb of Punchbowl. He was also a resident of Ashfield for many years.

He would perform for charity each week, including for the North Rocks Centre for Deaf and Blind Children and regularly opening and compering suburban events such as fetes and pet shows.

He died at the age of 71 on 26 April 1983.

== Honours ==
- Member of the Order of Australia (1976) "for services in the field of performing arts"
