= Senara =

Senara or SENARA may refer to:

- Saint Senara, legendary Cornish saint, originally recorded as male, then as female
- Senara language, spoken in Burkina Faso and Mali
- The National Irrigation and Drainage Service (SENARA) - see Water resources management in Costa Rica

== See also ==
- Sinara (disambiguation)
- Cynara (disambiguation)
- Synara San, a character in the animated television series Star Wars Resistance
