= Joe (1924 film) =

1924 film

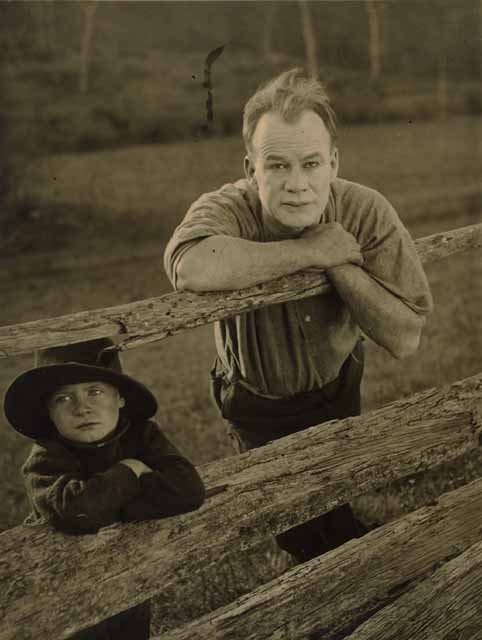
- Still from film
- Directed by: Beaumont Smith
- Written by: Beaumont Smith
- Based on: Joe Wilson & Joe Wilson's Mates by Henry Lawson
- Produced by: Beaumont Smith
- Starring: Arthur Tauchert; Marie Lorraine
- Cinematography: Lacey Percival
- Production company: Beaumont Smith's Productions
- Distributed by: Beaumont Smith
- Release date: 23 August 1924
- Running time: 5,000 feet
- Country: Australia
- Language: Silent

Joe is a 1924 Australian silent film comedy directed by Beaumont Smith based on the stories of Henry Lawson about the character Joe Wilson.

It is believed to be a lost film.

== Plot ==
Mary Brand (Constance Graham), the young housekeeper at old Black's station, becomes the wife of Joe Wilson (Arthur Tauchert), the painter. The couple take up farming, but Joe leaves on a business visit to Sydney, and becomes entangled in the affairs of his sister-in-law Barbara (Marie Lorraine), who has been instrumental in the destruction of a dress belonging to her employers. Joe pays for the dress and takes Barbara back to the bush.

Barbara reconciles with Harry Black, old Black's son, who has lately ended an unhappy marriage. Barbara and Harry fall in love.

Action sequences include a bushfire and a ball in the city.

== Cast ==
The Sun 24 August 1924

- Arthur Tauchert as Joe Wilson
- Marie Lorraine as Barbara
- Constance Graham as Mary Brand
- Gordon Collingridge
- Fernande Butler
- Hal Scott
- Dunstan Webb

== Production ==
The movie was the film debut of Marie Lorraine, one of the famous McDonagh sisters. It was shot in June 1924 on location in the Burragorang Valley near Sydney, with interiors at the Rushcutter's Bay studio of Australasian Films. The ball scene was shot at the Ambassador's Dance Palais over a one-day 14-hour shoot.

The film was known before production as When the World Was Wide and was shot in the under the title Plain Joe.

== Reception ==
The film received better reviews than most of Smith's work and was reportedly a box office success.

== See also ==
- List of lost films
