= Painted Daughters =

1925 film

- Directed by: F. Stuart-Whyte
- Based on: Florodora
- Starring: Zara Clinton; Marie Lorraine
- Cinematography: Lacey Percival
- Production company: Australasian Films (Master Pictures)
- Distributed by: Union Theatres
- Release date: 23 May 1925
- Running time: 6,000 feet (est.)
- Country: Australia
- Languages: Silent film English intertitles
- Budget: £4,000

Painted Daughters is a 1925 Australian silent film directed F. Stuart-Whyte. Only part of it survives today.

== Plot ==
In England, Mary Elliott and Courtland Nixon are lovers and dancing partners in a stage show called Florodora. Mary leaves Courtland and marries a wealthy admirer, who soon goes bankrupt and kills himself, leaving Mary to raise their daughter, Maryon. Courtland becomes a successful businessman.

Maryon grows up to become a dancer. A theatrical press agent, Ernest, reunites the cast of Floradora and Courtland is reunited with Mary. There is a fire in which both Mary and Courtland are injured, but they survive and decide to get married. So too do Maryon and Ernest.

== Cast ==
- Zara Clinton as Mary Elliott
- Nina Devitt as Maryon Fielding
- Billie Sim as Rita Railton
- Marie Lorraine as Evelyn Shaw
- Loretta May as Sheila Kay
- Fernande Butler as Nina Walcott
- Lucille Lisle as Olive Lennox
- Peggy Pryde as wardrobe mistress
- Belle Bates as Salvation Nell
- Phyllis du Barry as Saharab
- Rawdon Blandford as Courtland Nixon
- Martin Walker as Warren Fielding
- William O'Hanlon as Ernest Glenning
- Compton Coutts as Harry Selby
- Billy Ryan as Eric Thurston
- Herbert Walton as Harry Gratton
- Grafton Williams as Edward Thayne
- Roland Conway as Charles Dailey
- Louis Witts as Peter Flynn
- S Hackett as Flash

== Production ==
The movie was the first in a series of films produced by Australasian Films and released through Union Pictures under the banner of "Master Pictures". It was part of an attempt by Australasian Films and Union Theatres, led by Stuart F. Doyle, to make world-class films for the international market. He ended up spending over £100,000 on developing a new studio at Bondi and making a series of features from 1925 to 1928. For this first movie, Australasian decided to import a director from overseas.

F. Stuart-Whyte, a Scotsman who worked in Hollywood for fifteen years, including as assistant on Douglas Fairbanks Films, was hired. He arrived in Sydney in November 1924 to commence pre-production.

The movie was shot in a studio at Rushcutters Bay in Sydney with former Hollywood star Louise Lovely assisting with screen testing. The majority of cast and crew were Australian, but the cast included British music hall star Peggy Pryde, who was then living in Australia. Zara Fielding had been in Hollywood for four years.

During production, a portion of the movie worth £600 was stolen from the production office at the studuo at Rushcutter's Bay. Other accounts said 2,000 feet of footage. The thief was revealed to be a small boy and the footage was returned.

Filming took place through March and April 1925.

== Reception ==
=== Box office ===
The movie was popular at the box office. The success of this and Sunrise (1926) prompted Australasian to announce they would make twelve new films over the next twelve months. This did not eventuate however the company did make several more films.

The Bulletin reported the film "was a box-oflice success less because of its intrinsic merits, which were inconsiderable, than because the public is so hungry for Australian pictures that it is willing, at the moment, to temper justice with mercy; but that mood won't last. Australian film-producers will have to go in for good Australian stories, settings and actors. People will soon turn away from cheap imitations of Hollywood stuff and unknowns who act as if they had St. Vitus's dance."

According to writers Brian Adams and Graham Shirley:

The film's modest local success was probably due more to publicity than directorial skill... While Painted Daughters emerged as a passable programme picture, the incompatibility of its internationalism and a limited budget led Australasian to inject enough national sentiment into their subsequent films to appeal to the home market at the very least.

=== Critical ===
According to Everyones "a clever plot formed a fitting medium to place before the public the Sydney girl in all her beauty and joyousness... As an example of Australian moving picture work, Painted Daughters takes a high place. The standard of production is excellent throughout, and special care has been taken to make the sub-titles artistic, bright, and in keeping with the best examples of this important branch of picture work."

Another review in the same trade paper stated:

With few exceptions the cast is composed of tyros, so that the work of the producer has been by no means a sinecure. However, he has done remarkably well with the talent at his disposal and has, furthermore, succeeded in giving us something different in the way of stories, allegorical embellishments, and ambitious presentation... Exhibitors should always do their best to encourage and support local productions and in screening Painted Daughters they will add a further link to the chain of pretentious Australian motion pictures.

The Bulletin reported the film "is pretty bad, but no worse than many imported films." Triad magazine stated the film:

By no means be called a success, but it is in many ways an improvement on former Australian productions. Many of the crudities of directorship are missing, but the acting retains its unfinished and amateurish character. Nina Devitt, playing the daughter of an old stage favourite, is sempiternally conscious of the camera, and the others partake of the same incompetency. Surely there are screen aspirants with greater talent than these have.
