= Showgirl's Luck =

1931 film

- Directed by: Norman Dawn
- Written by: Martyn Keith
- Starring: Arthur Tauchert
- Cinematography: Norman Dawn; Jack Fletcher; Walter Sully
- Edited by: Norman Dawn
- Music by: Jack O'Hagan; Ormond Bulmers
- Production company: Australian Talkies
- Release dates: December 1931 (Sydney); 1933 (UK)
- Running time: 55 mins
- Country: Australia
- Language: English

Showgirl's Luck is a 1931 Australian musical directed by Norman Dawn. It was the first Australian full talking film.

== Synopsis ==
Peggy Morton (Susan Denis) works as the star of a touring tent show in rural Queensland when she is offered the lead in the first Australian talking film, being made in the Blue Mountains. A rival, Mona Blake (Sadie Bedford) tells her that the offer has been withdrawn and takes the job instead. Peggy's show closes and she finds a job by posing as a Swedish maid. She winds up employed at the same hotel being used by the film company and discovers Mona's deception. Mona's husband abducts Peggy but an actor, Barry (Arthur Clarke) rescues her. Peggy ends up getting cast in the film.

== Cast ==
- Susan Denis as Peggy Morton
- Arthur Tauchert as Hap
- Arthur Clarke as Barry
- Fred Bluett as Hollis
- Sadie Bedford as Mona
- Paul Longuet as Dud
- George Saunders as Uncle George
- Peggy Pryde
- George Lloyd
- Les Coney
- Des Tooley
- the Loretto Brothers

== Production ==
The film was directed by Norman Dawn, who had previously made two films in Australia. He returned to Sydney in October 1929 with plans to make a sound movie using a sound-on-disc recording system. He announced he would go into partnership with J. C. Williamson Ltd but this does not seem to have eventuated. He formed a company, Australian Talkies. One of his investors was radio announcer, "Uncle George" Saunders. An original title of the film was Talkie Mad.

Shooting started in May 1930 and took place at the Lapstone Hill Hotel in the Blue Mountains and at the Sydney Showground. The female lead, Susan Denis, was Dawn's wife. Dawn liked to use sophisticated optical effects such as exposures and matts. Mona Donaldson made final cut of the film but did not produce the work print.

== Release ==
By the time the film was ready for trade screening in January 1931, the sound-on-disc system was out of date and Dawn tried to transfer the sound to an optical track. It did not premiere until December 1931, after which it only ran a week in Australian cinemas. Although the film managed to be released in the UK, commercial and critical reception was poor and Dawn made no further films in Australia.

Uncle George Saunders later declared bankruptcy and complained about Dawn:

The directors [of Australian Talkies] borrowed £1,400. Norman Dawn and his wife were brought from the United States to produce a picture, and then Dawn disappeared. They learnt he had gone back to America. He had trouble with his wife and left us high and dry with the picture. The person who lent us the money took possession. The directors lost everything.
