= What! No Beer? =

1933 film by Edward Sedgwick

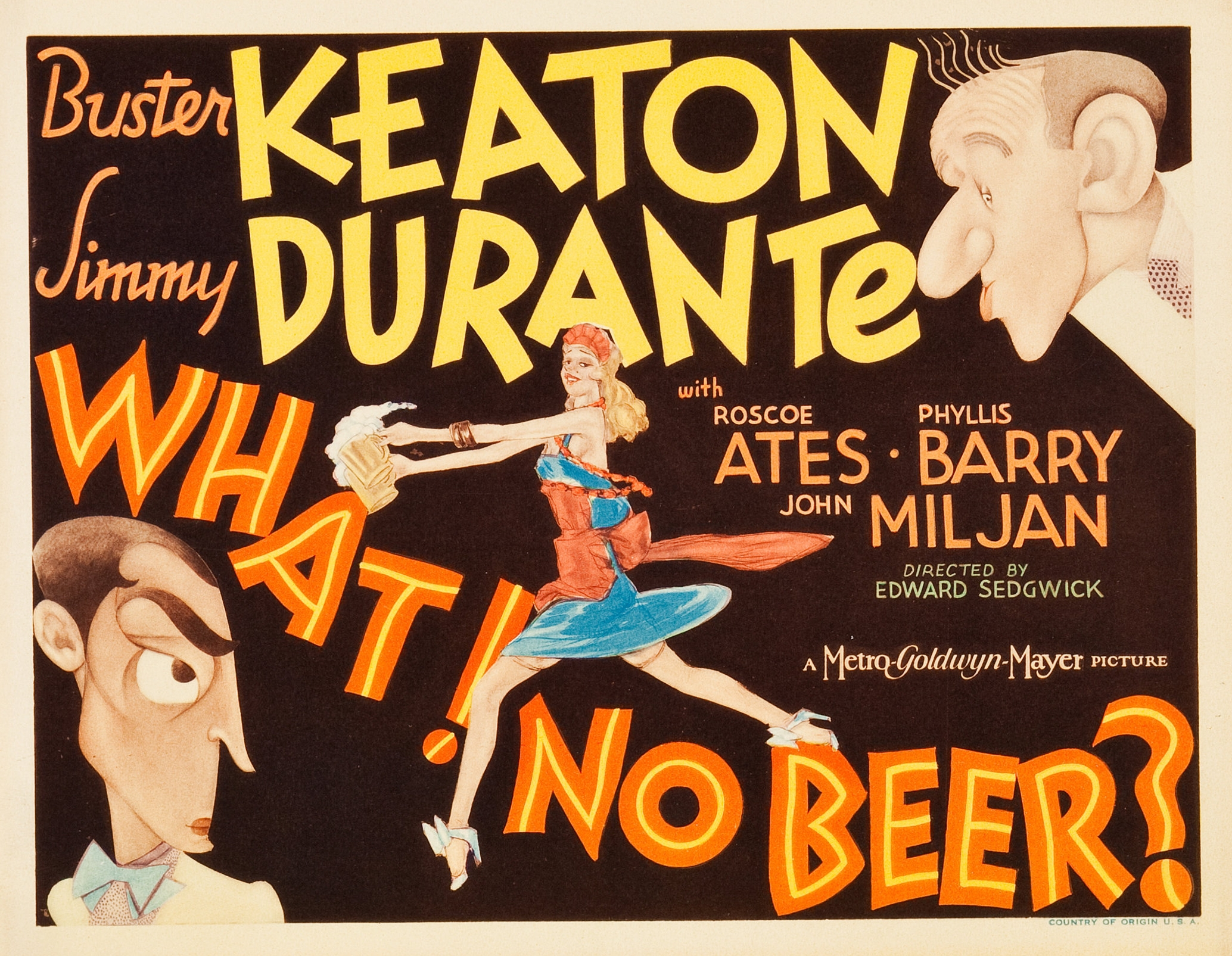
- Lobby card for the film
- Directed by: Edward Sedgwick
- Written by: Robert E. Hopkins
- Screenplay by: Carey Wilson; Jack Cluett
- Produced by: Lawrence Weingarten (uncredited)
- Starring: Buster Keaton; Jimmy Durante
- Cinematography: Harold Wenstrom
- Edited by: Frank Sullivan
- Distributed by: Metro-Goldwyn-Mayer
- Release date: February 10, 1933
- Running time: 66 minutes
- Country: United States
- Language: English

What! No Beer? is a 1933 Pre-Code comedy film released by Metro-Goldwyn-Mayer directed by Edward Sedgwick and starring Buster Keaton and Jimmy Durante. MGM had also paired Keaton and Durante as a comedy team during this period in The Passionate Plumber and Speak Easily.

== Plot ==
It's an election year, with the possible end of Prohibition in sight. Taxidermist Elmer J. Butts (Buster Keaton) goes to a "dry" rally, where he follows the beautiful Hortense (Phyllis Barry) and her bootlegger boyfriend Butch Lorado (John Miljan) into the meeting hall. The next day, barber Jimmy Potts (Jimmy Durante), driving a car covered in pro-booze stickers, convinces Elmer to vote wet. They go to the polls, causing confusion and wrecking the voting booths.

Jimmy tells Elmer his million-dollar idea: making their own beer for a thirsty public. Elmer wants to be rich, too, so he can marry Hortense – and he has $10,000 hidden in his stuffed animals—so he buys a derelict brewery. Elmer and his hired hands bottle as much brew as they can, having several mishaps with exploding bottles and foam piling up over their heads. The police raid the brewery, because repeal isn't official yet.

With Prohibition threatened, rival bootlegger Spike Moran (Edward Brophy) realizes that his operation is washed up. Butch Lorado is also worried. Spike and Butch meet to discuss their business interests. Butch vows to eliminate his competition.

At the brewery, Elmer resolves to make deliveries himself, and drives a beer truck up a hill. Butch's men decide to kill him on the street, but the barrels fall off the back of the truck and chase the gangsters away. Meanwhile, Butch declares himself the new partner in Elmer's brewery. Hortense slips Elmer a note about an imminent police raid. Elmer escapes in a barrel, grabs a blackboard, and drives away. He shows what he's written on the board to everyone on the street: "Free beer at the brewery." The factory is mobbed, and by the time the police arrive, there's no beer—and no evidence—foiling both the police and Butch.

Later, a senator speaks to Congress, telling the story of how gangsters were put out of business when a crowd stormed the brewery. Beer becomes legal. At Butts's Beer Garden, Elmer and Jimmy arrive in an open car. Jimmy offers free beer, and he and Elmer are mobbed again. Jimmy, holding a frosty brew aloft, addresses the camera: "It's your turn next, folks. It won't be long now!"

== Cast ==
- Buster Keaton as Elmer J. Butts
- Jimmy Durante as Jimmy Potts
- Roscoe Ates as Schultz
- Phyllis Barry as Hortense
- John Miljan as Butch Lorado
- Henry Armetta as Tony
- Edward Brophy as Spike Moran
- Charles Dunbar as Mulligan
- Charles Giblyn as Chief
- Sidney Bracey as Dr. Smith, Prohibition speaker
- James Donlan as Al

== Production ==
The filming of What! No Beer? was difficult. Since joining MGM in 1928, Keaton was not accorded the creative freedom that he had enjoyed during the silent era. He did not like MGM's decision to make him and Jimmy Durante a double-act: "we just did not belong in the same movies". By 1933, personal problems and a messy divorce were interfering with Keaton's work. Keaton later recalled that his drinking cost What! No Beer? only one day's filming, though another account has him leaving for Mexico unannounced on a drunken jaunt, resulting in director Edward Sedgwick having to shoot around him. In spite of the difficulties, Keaton was enough of a professional (and a trained acrobat) to complete the film, doing extreme pratfalls even while visibly impaired.

== Aftermath ==
A myth persists that the Keaton talkies were critical and popular failures that virtually finished Keaton's career. One film historian writes, "From 1929 to 1933 he made a series of feature length talkies... at M-G-M. These films had neither the quality nor the success of his silent films." Several of them were highly successful moneymakers. Keaton himself called What! No Beer? "a 100 per cent turkey"; it was, however, a critical and box-office hit. His partnership with Durante might have continued (MGM had already scheduled another film with the pair, Buddies), but What! No Beer? turned out to be Keaton's last MGM feature, and his last starring feature in the United States. Keaton then starred in 26 short subjects, and usually played featured roles after 1941.

== Bibliography ==
- Keaton, Buster; Samuels, Charles (1960). My Wonderful World of Slapstick. Garden City, New York: Doubleday.
- Lebel, J.P. (1967). Buster Keaton. Translated by Stovin, P.D. London: A. Zwemmer; A.S. Barnes.
- McPherson, Edward (2005). Buster Keaton: Tempest in a Flat Hat. New York: Newmarket Press. ISBN 1-55704-664-6.
- Robinson, David (1969). Buster Keaton. London; Bloomington, Indiana: Indiana University Press.
