= Captain Fortune Show =

Australian television series

- Genre: Children's television
- Presented by: Alan Herbert
- Country of origin: Australia
- Original language: English

Original release
- Network: ATN-7
- Release: 1957 – 1961

The Captain Fortune Show (also known as Captain Fortune's Saturday Party) is an Australian children's television show which first broadcast on ATN-7 in 1957. It starred Alan Herbert and featured various segments with puppets, clowns, and other entertainment.

Herbert's character Captain Fortune spoke directly with the kids, live and without a script. At the height of the show's popularity, it aired three times during the weekdays and also on Saturday mornings. The show also included segments with Uncle Monty and Roy Kinghorn, and is perhaps best remembered for the show's introductory sequence, which involved the young children running into the Captain's house unannounced and gathering around a large barrel, which contained a mannequin (named "Short John O'Copper"). The Captain would sing "Who's that kno-o-cking on my barrel?" several times, after which a puppet would pop out of the top of the barrel and the Captain would put on a puppet show for the young viewers.

Among the many actors who regularly contributed to the show was Les Foxcroft, best known for his stint on the Australian TV show The Last Resort, Chris Beard, Clifford Warne (with his puppet Gus) and Reg Quartly (in the role of "Uncle Reg" or "Uncle Reggie").

Alan Herbert, who played the part of Captain Fortune wore a false beard (which was later phased out as Herbert grew a real beard) and "naval uniform". After four years he left the show due to health problems. In addition to the show, Herbert was known for doing work for many charitable organizations involving children.

Because the show was broadcast live, and the series pre-dated the inception of personal video recorders and VCRs, no film copies of the Captain Fortune show are known to exist.

From 1962 a successor program, "The Town of Make Believe", which "had evolved from Captain Fortune's work", screened every Saturday on ATN-7 and was compered by Arch McKirdy ("Uncle Mac") with the assistance of "Uncle" Reg Quartly. In 1966 that program was renamed "Fun Fair" and given a new time slot of 2pm on Saturday with Reg Quartly in the lead role.

== San Francisco version ==
A similar version of the show, with the same name, was broadcast in San Francisco on KPIX-TV. It was airing by September 1950. A local artist named Peter Abenheim (actually an immigrant from England) played the host, at first named "Cap'n Pete." Cap'n Pete told tall tales of his seafaring exploits, illustrated by his own drawings. The show opened with children running to gather around the barrel inhabited by "Short John O'Copper," a hand puppet pirate who sang (in Irish pirate brogue) the "Who's that knocking?" song. By the mid-'50s, "Cap'n Pete" had become Captain Fortune, but Short John kept his name and sidekick role.
