= Longford Lyell Award =

Australian film and television industry lifetime achievement award

- Awarded for: In recognition of "a person who has shown an unwavering commitment over many years to excellence in the film and television industries and has … contributed substantially to the enrichment of Australian screen culture"
- Country: Australia
- Presented by: Australian Academy of Cinema and Television Arts (AACTA)
- Formerly called: AFI Raymond Longford Award
- First award: 1968; 58 years ago
- Currently held by: Bruce Beresford (2026)
- Website: www.aacta.org/aacta-awards/longford-lyell-award/

The Longford Lyell Award is a lifetime achievement award presented by the Australian Academy of Cinema and Television Arts (AACTA), a non-profit organisation whose aim is "to identify, award, promote and celebrate Australia's greatest achievements in film and television." The award is presented at the annual AACTA Awards, which hand out accolades for technical achievements in feature film, television, documentaries and short films. From 1968 to 2010, the award was presented by the Australian Film Institute (AFI), the Academy's parent organisation, at the annual Australian Film Institute Awards (known as the AFI Awards). When the AFI launched the Academy in 2011, it changed the annual ceremony to the AACTA Awards, with the current award being a continuum of the AFI Raymond Longford Award.

Originally named after Australian prolific producer, director, writer and actor Raymond Longford (1878–1959), the award recognises "a person who has shown an unwavering commitment over many years to excellence in the film and television industries and has, through their body of work to date, contributed substantially to the enrichment of Australian screen culture", and is the highest honour the Academy bestows. In 2015, the name of the award was changed to Longford Lyell Award in recognition of Longford's creative and life partner, actress and filmmaker Lottie Lyell.

Recipients of this award are film and television directors, directors, producers, actors, cinematographers and film editors. People of Australian origin dominate the list, but European-born Australian citizens have also been recognised. The award was first presented to film director and editor Ian Dunlop. The award has also been made posthumously to actor John Meillon in 1989 who died that year.

== Recipients ==
Year	Image	Name	Country of origin	Notes	Ref(s)
AFI Raymond Longford Award
1968	—N/a	Ian Dunlop	United Kingdom	Director	
1970	—N/a	Stanley Hawes	United Kingdom	Director, producer	
1976	Ken G. Hall	Ken G. Hall	Australia	Director	
1977	Charles Chauvel	Charles Chauvel	Australia	Director, producer, writer	
1978	Marie Lorraine	Marie Lorraine	Australia	Filmmaker	
1978	Paulette McDonagh in 1928	Paulette McDonagh	Australia	Filmmaker	
1978	Phyllis McDonagh in 1928	Phyllis McDonagh	Australia	Filmmaker	
1979	—N/a	Jerzy Toeplitz	Russian Empire	Founding Director of AFTRS	
1980	—N/a	Tim Burstall	United Kingdom	Director	
1981	Phillip Adams	Phillip Adams	Australia	Producer, journalist	
1982	—N/a	Eric Porter	Australia	Animator	
1983	—N/a	Bill Gooley	Australia	Film technician	
1984	—N/a	David Williams	Australia	Exhibitor, distributor	
1985	—N/a	Don Crosby	Australia	Actor	
1986	Barry Jones	Barry Jones	Australia	Federal Minister & first Chairman of AFTRS	
1987	—N/a	Paul Riomfalvy	Hungary	First Director of NSW Film Corp	
1988	—N/a	Russell Boyd	Australia	Cinematographer	
1989	John Meillon	John Meillon (Note: Awarded posthumously)	Australia	Actor	
1990	Peter Weir in 2011	Peter Weir	Australia	Director	
1991	Fred Schepisi in 2011	Fred Schepisi	Australia	Director	
1992	—N/a	Lee Robinson	Australia	Director	
1993	—N/a	Sue Milliken	Australia	Producer	
1994	Jack Thompson in 2014	Jack Thompson	Australia	Actor	
1995	George Miller in 2017	George Miller	Australia	Director	
1997	—N/a	Jan Chapman	Australia	Producer	
1998	—N/a	Charles "Bud" Tingwell	Australia	Actor	
1999	—N/a	John Politzer	Australia	Exhibitor, distributor	
2000	—N/a	Anthony Buckley	Australia	Producer	
2001	David Stratton in 2012	David Stratton	United Kingdom	Film critic	
2002	—N/a	Patricia Edgar	Australia	Producer	
2003	Ted Robinson in 2013	Ted Robinson	Australia	Writer, producer, director, choreographer	
2004	—N/a	Patricia Lovell	Australia	Producer	
2005	—N/a	Ray Barrett	Australia	Actor	
2006	—N/a	Ian Jones	Australia	Writer, producer, director	
2007	—N/a	David Hannay	New Zealand	Producer	
2008	—N/a	Dione Gilmour	Australia	Natural History filmmaker	
2009	Geoffrey Rush in 2011	Geoffrey Rush	Australia	Actor	
2010	—N/a	Reg Grundy	Australia	Broadcaster, producer, entrepreneur	
Raymond Longford Award
2012	—N/a	Donald McAlpine	Australia	Cinematographer	
2013	—N/a	Al Clark	United Kingdom	Producer	
2014	Jacki Weaver in 2012	Jacki Weaver	Australia	Actress	
Longford Lyell Award
2015	—N/a	Andrew Knight	Australia	Writer, producer	
2015	Cate Blanchett in 2011	Cate Blanchett	Australia	Actress	
2016	Paul Hogan in 1980	Paul Hogan	Australia	Actor	
2017	Phillip Noyce in 2010	Phillip Noyce	Australia	Director	
2018	Bryan Brown in 2009	Bryan Brown	Australia	Actor	
2019	Sam Neill in 2010	Sam Neill	New Zealand	Actor	
2021	David Gulpilil in 2006	David Gulpilil	Australia	Actor	
2022	Catherine Martin in May 2013	Catherine Martin	Australia	Costume & production designer	
2025		Working Dog Productions (founded by Santo Cilauro, Tom Gleisner, Jane Kennedy, Michael Hirsh, and Rob Sitch)	Australia	Production company (Note: First organisation to receive the award)	
2026	Bruce Beresford in 2016	Bruce Beresford	Australia	Director	
