= My Wife's Best Friend =

1952 film

- Directed by: Richard Sale
- Written by: John Briard Harding
- Screenplay by: Isobel Lennart
- Produced by: Robert Bassler
- Starring: Anne Baxter; Macdonald Carey; Cecil Kellaway
- Cinematography: Leo Tover
- Edited by: Robert L. Simpson
- Music by: Leigh Harline
- Production company: Twentieth Century-Fox
- Distributed by: Twentieth Century-Fox
- Release date: October 10, 1952 (New York)
- Running time: 87 minutes
- Country: United States
- Language: English

My Wife's Best Friend is a 1952 American comedy film directed by Richard Sale and starring Anne Baxter, Macdonald Carey and Catherine McLeod.

== Plot ==
George and Virginia Mason, a couple from Illinois, are aboard an airliner headed for their second honeymoon in Hawaii. When the plane develops serious engine trouble, George, believing that he is about to die, confesses to Virginia that had an affair with her best friend Jane Richards. Virginia envisions several potential revenge scenarios, casting herself as various famous women of history. The plane lands safely and Virginia learns that the affair was nothing more than a discreet flirtation.

== Cast ==
- Anne Baxter as Virginia Mason
- Macdonald Carey as George Mason
- Cecil Kellaway as Rev. Thomas Chamberlain
- Max Showalter as Pete Bentham
- Catherine McLeod as Jane Richards
- Leif Erickson as Nicholas Reed
- Frances Bavier as Mrs. Chamberlain
- Mary Sullivan as Flossy Chamberlain
- Martin Milner as Buddy Chamberlain
- Billie Bird as Katie
- Michael Ross as Matt
- Morgan Farley as Dr. McCurran
- Junius Matthews as Rev. Dr. Smith
- Henry Kulky as Pug
- Emmett Vogan as Walter Rogers
- Ann Staunton as Hannah
- Edgar Dearing as Police Chief
- May Wynn as Stewardess

== Production ==
In a contemporary review for The New York Times, critic Bosley Crowther called the film "program filler" and wrote: "It's supposed to be very funny, but you want to know something? It's not!"

Critic Grace Kingsley of the Los Angeles Times praised Anne Baxter's performance, calling her "a highly gifted comedienne".
