= Cynara (1932 film) =

1932 film directed by King Vidor

- Movie poster
- Directed by: King Vidor
- Written by: Frances Marion; Lynn Starling
- Based on: An Imperfect Lover; 1929 novel by Robert Gore-Browne
- Produced by: Samuel Goldwyn
- Starring: Ronald Colman; Kay Francis; Phyllis Barry
- Cinematography: Ray June
- Edited by: Hugh Bennett
- Music by: Alfred Newman
- Production company: Samuel Goldwyn Productions
- Distributed by: United Artists
- Release date: December 24, 1932
- Running time: 75 minutes
- Country: United States
- Language: English

Cynara is a 1932 American pre-Code romantic drama film about a British lawyer who pays a heavy price for an affair. It stars Ronald Colman, Kay Francis, and Phyllis Barry. It is based on the 1928 novel An Imperfect Lover by Robert Gore-Browne. In February 2020, the film was shown at the 70th Berlin International Film Festival, as part of a retrospective dedicated to King Vidor's career. A text panel at the beginning of the film explains the title: “Inspired by Ernest Dowson's immortal lines—‘I have been faithful to thee, Cynara, in my fashion.” The poem in question, Non Sum Qualis eram Bonae Sub Regno Cynarae, was first published in 1894.

== Plot ==
In Naples, disgraced London barrister James "Jim" Warlock prepares to part from his beloved wife Clemency and start anew in South Africa. When she asks him to explain the events leading to his downfall, a flashback ensues.

Hard-working, successful, and deeply in love, Jim is looking forward to his seventh wedding anniversary. His friend John Tring thinks Jim needs “color” in his life and laughs at him for being "the last of the virtuous men". Jim is crestfallen when Clemency informs him that she has to take her sister Gorla to Venice for a month to get her away from a parachute jumper, the latest in a string of unsuitable men with whom she has fallen in love.

While the women are away, Tring takes his friend out to dine. At the restaurant, a young shopgirl named Doris Lea in the next booth dons Jim's bowler hat on a dare from her friend and flatmate Milly Miles. Tring is enchanted, and persuades the reluctant Jim to join the girls. Doris takes a great liking to Jim and gives him her address. Later, he tears up the slip of paper.

Tring has other ideas. He arranges for Jim to judge a swimsuit contest and informs Doris, who becomes a contestant. Jim names her the winner. When she slips and injures her ankle, he picks her up and takes her back to her flat. There, he warns her that he is married and that nothing good can come of their relationship. She tells him that she will not cause trouble when he wishes to end it. They embark on an idyllic affair.

However, when Clemency, Gorla, and Gorla's new Italian fiancé finally return, Doris finds it impossible to give up the man she loves. Finally, Jim writes her a letter telling her he cannot see her anymore. She responds by committing suicide.

The letter is found, and Jim is forced to testify at the inquest. When the coroner asks if Doris had any prior relationships, Jim protects her privacy and refuses to answer, even though she told him of an earlier liaison. Jim is guilty of no criminal offence, but the scandal destroys his promising career.

The flashback ends. After Jim leaves to board his ocean liner, Tring comes to talk to Clemency. He accepts a share of the blame for what happened, and he reminds Clemency that she may never see Jim again. She rushes to the ship to join her husband.

== Cast ==
- Ronald Colman as Jim Warlock
- Kay Francis as Clemency Warlock
- Phyllis Barry as Doris Emily Lea
- Henry Stephenson as John Tring
- Viva Tattersall as Milly Miles
- Florine McKinney as Gorla
- Clarissa Selwynne as Onslow
- Paul Porcasi as Joseph, Maitre d'
- George Kirby as Mr Boots, MC of the swimsuit competition
- Donald Stuart as Henry
- Wilson Benge as Merton, Jim's valet
- Halliwell Hobbes as Coroner
