= Old Los Angeles =

1948 film by Joseph Kane

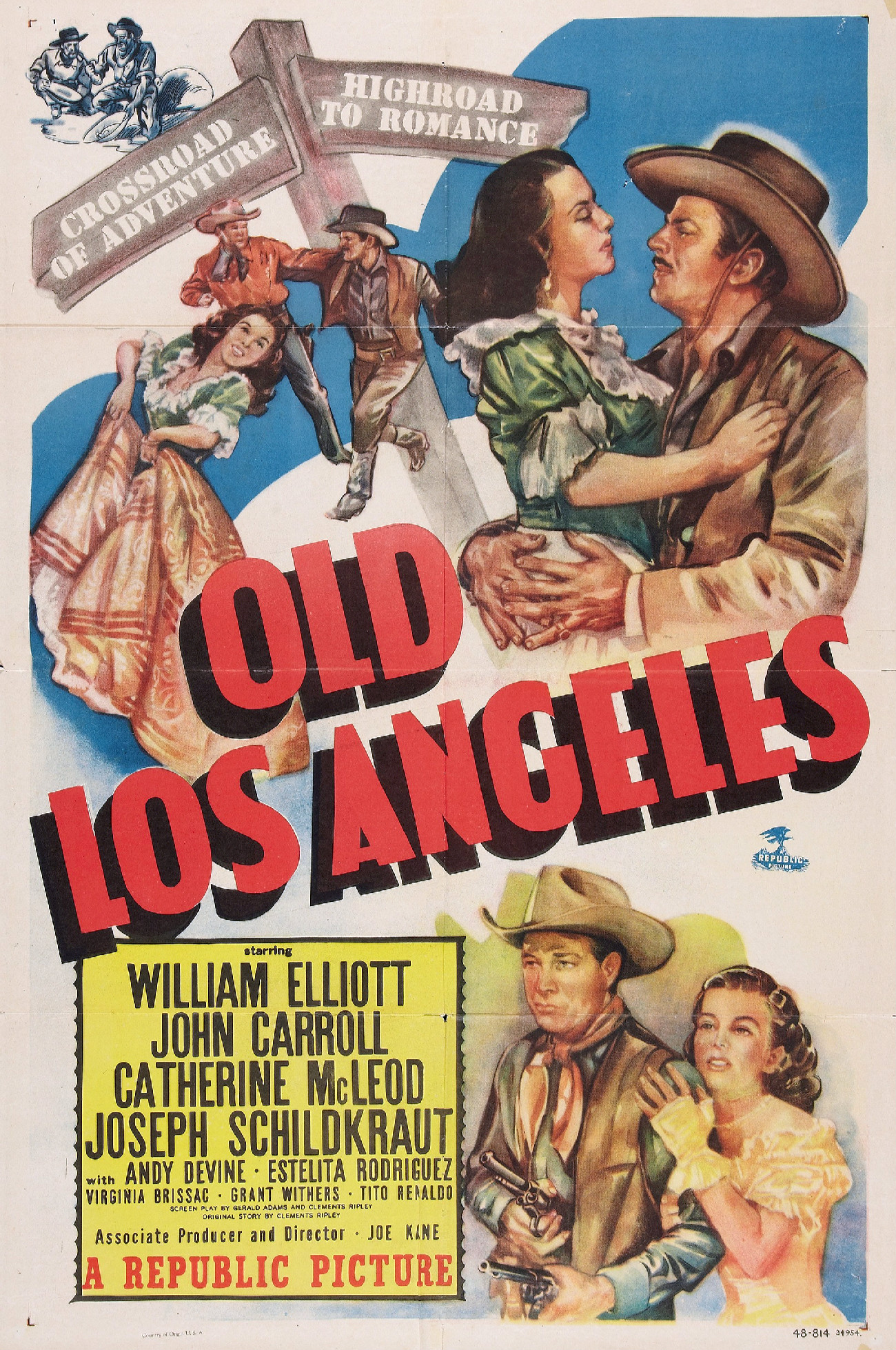
- Theatrical release poster
- Directed by: Joseph Kane
- Screenplay by: Gerald Drayson Adams; Clements Ripley
- Story by: Clements Ripley
- Produced by: Joseph Kane
- Starring: Wild Bill Elliott; John Carroll; Catherine McLeod; Joseph Schildkraut; Andy Devine; Estelita Rodriguez
- Cinematography: William Bradford
- Edited by: Richard L. Van Enger
- Music by: Ernest Gold
- Production company: Republic Pictures
- Distributed by: Republic Pictures
- Release date: April 25, 1948 (United States)
- Running time: 88 minutes
- Country: United States
- Language: English

Old Los Angeles is a 1948 American Western film directed by Joseph Kane and written by Gerald Drayson Adams and Clements Ripley. The film stars Wild Bill Elliott, John Carroll, Catherine McLeod, Joseph Schildkraut, Andy Devine and Estelita Rodriguez.

== Plot ==
When Bill Stockton arrives in the town of Old Los Angeles to meet his brother, he quickly figures out that the outlaws rule. He is then confronted with the reality that his brother Larry has been murdered for gold. This sets him off on a quest to avenge his brother's death, which comes hand in hand with even more trouble.

== Cast ==
- Wild Bill Elliott as Bill Stockton
- John Carroll as Johnny Morrell
- Catherine McLeod as Marie Marlowe
- Joseph Schildkraut as Luis Savarin
- Andy Devine as Sam Bowie
- Estelita Rodriguez as Estelita Del Rey
- Virginia Brissac as Señora Del Rey
- Grant Withers as Marshal Ed Luckner
- Tito Renaldo as Tonio Del Rey
- Roy Barcroft as Clyborne
- Henry Brandon as Larry Stockton
- Julian Rivero as Diego
- Earle Hodgins as Horatius P. Gassoway
- Augie Gomez as Miguel
