= Phyllis McDonagh =

Australian film producer, production designer and journalist

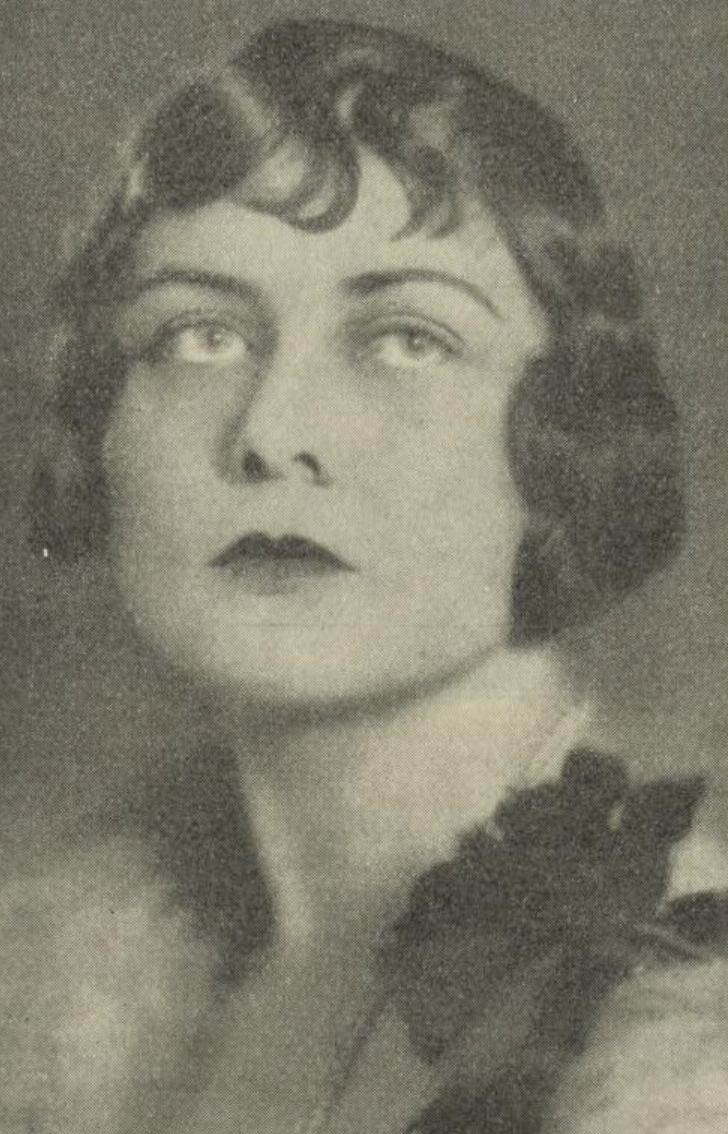
- Phyllis McDonagh in 1928
- Born: Phyllis Glory McDonagh; 7 January 1900
- Died: 17 October 1978
- Relatives: Marie Lorraine (sister), Paulette McDonagh (sister)

Phyllis Glory McDonagh (7 January 1900 – 17 October 1978) was an Australian film producer, production designer and journalist, who often worked in collaboration with her sisters Paulette and Isabella.

== Early life ==
McDongah was born on Macquaire Street in Sydney, Australia, on 7 January 1900 and was the second child of seven born to John Michael McDonagh, and Annie Jane (Anita) McDonagh (née Amora).

She attended school at the Convent of the Sacred Heart, Elizabeth Bay, as a boarder alongside her two sisters Isabella and Paulette. While at school theatre rather than study was the sisters' main interest as recalled by Phyllis McDonagh "We cut our teeth on theatre. When we went to boarding school that's all we talked and thought about. Schoolwork was a poor second".

== Career ==
=== Film ===
Phyllis McDonagh began her career in film alongside her two sisters Isabella and Paulette with the film Those Who Love in 1926. Phyllis worked as the production manager, and collaborated closely with her younger sister Paulette who would direct and write their majority of their films. Their older sister Isabel, known by her stage name Marie Lorraine, starred as the actress in many of their productions.

Made on small budgets, these films were entertaining society melodramas of romance, sacrifice and parental opposition, set against an urban background: a contrast to the bush emphasis in contemporary Australian films. The sisters used the family's colonial home, Drummoyne House, and its antique and elaborate furnishings, to give their films great style at little expense.

The first two of the sisters feature films, Those Who Love and The Far Paradise, were both met with critical acclaim, while their third The Cheaters earned much lower reviews from both the public and critics due to its poor sound effects.

During the depression the sisters made several short sporting documentaries, including Australia in the Swim with 'Boy' Charlton and the Olympic swimming team, (Sir) Donald Bradman in How I Play Cricket and Phar Lap in The Mighty Conqueror.

=== Journalism ===
After leaving the film industry in the late 1930s, Phyllis became a journalist and moved to New Zealand, where she worked as editor of New Zealand Truth. She later returned to Sydney with her husband and worked as a freelance journalist and short-story writer, before becoming social editor for the North Shore Times in 1960.

== Personal life ==
On 15 October 1941, Phyllis married salesman Leo Francis Joseph O'Brien. Phyllis McDonagh died on 17 October 1978.

== Awards ==
- In 1978, Phyllis received the Raymond Longford award (Australian Film Institute), alongside her sisters Isabel and Paulette.
- In 2001, Phyllis McDonagh was inducted onto the Victorian Honour Roll of Women.

== Select filmography ==
- Those Who Love (1926)
- The Far Paradise (1928)
- The Cheaters (1930)
- Two Minutes Silence (1933)
