= Catherine McLeod =

American actress (1921–1997)

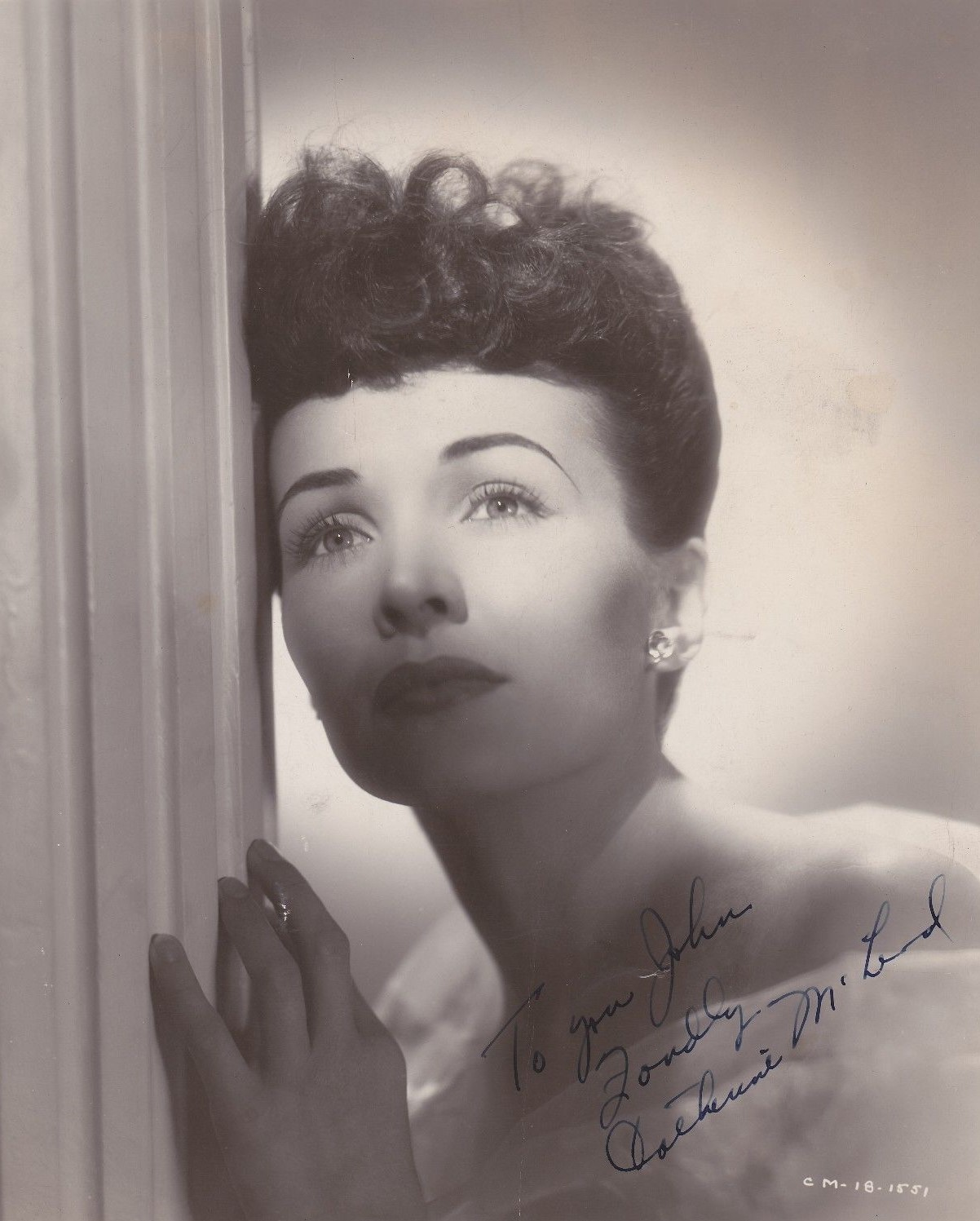
- McLeod in 1946
- Born: July 2, 1921; Santa Monica, California, U.S.
- Died: May 11, 1997 (aged 75); Los Angeles, California, U.S.
- Occupation: Actress
- Spouse(s): Bill Gerds (m. 1947; div. 1949) Don Keefer (m. 1950)
- Children: 3

Catherine McLeod (July 2, 1921 – May 11, 1997) was an American actress who made over 60 television and movie appearances between 1944 and 1976. She memorably portrayed the one woman whom James Garner's character Bret Maverick wanted to marry on the 1957 ABC/Warner Brothers television series Maverick in the episode "Rage for Vengeance".

== Early years ==
McLeod was born in Santa Monica, California. Her schooling came in an Alhambra convent. She acted in a Los Angeles little theater and studied in the Bliss-Hayden drama workshop. She worked in a movie theater in Reno and later became a chorus girl in musicals.

== Career ==
=== Film ===
McLeod's films included the leading role as a concert pianist in Frank Borzage's I've Always Loved You (1946), Courage of Lassie (1946), The Fabulous Texan (1947), Borzage's That's My Man (1947), Old Los Angeles (1948), My Wife's Best Friend (1952), A Blueprint for Murder (1953), William Witney's The Outcast (1954), Ride the Wild Surf (1964), and Lipstick (1976).

=== Television ===
On October 10, 1950, McLeod starred in "Criminal's Mark" on the TV version of Suspense. She made two guest appearances on the television series Perry Mason: Lorraine Ferrell in "The Case of the Vagabond Vixen" (1957) and Nora Huxley in "The Case of the Glittering Goldfish" (1959). In both roles, she played the wife of the murder victim, but was neither the defendant nor actual murderer.

McLeod appeared in dozens of other series, including The Millionaire, Meet McGraw, Richard Diamond, Private Detective, Maverick with James Garner in the episode "A Rage for Vengeance," 77 Sunset Strip, Mickey Spillane's Mike Hammer, Bronco, Colt .45, Lawman (in the 1961 episode "The Prodigal Mother," with child actor Billy Booth), Bonanza, Hazel, Hawaiian Eye, Have Gun – Will Travel, The Outer Limits, The Virginian, Gunsmoke (as "Letty Rickers", an abused wife of a homesteader turned cowardly killer in S2E29's "Wrong Man" – played by her real-life husband Don Keefer), and the "Ten Thousand Horses Singing" episode of Studio One opposite James Dean and John Forsythe.

McLeod's greatest impact upon American consciousness by far, however, was as purveyor of one of the most ubiquitous catchphrases of its era when she portrayed the woman in the 1963 headache remedy Anacin television commercial, who plaintively but irritably said, "Mother, please! I'd rather do it myself!" The announcer's voiceover would then intone, "Sure you have a headache... tense, irritable.... but don't take it out on her."

== Personal life ==
McLeod married San Francisco dental student Bill Gerds in 1947. They divorced in 1949. McLeod's second husband was actor Don Keefer. They were married from May 7, 1950, until her death in 1997. They had three children.

== Radio appearances ==
Year	Program	Episode/source
1946	Lux Radio Theatre	I've Always Loved You

== Filmography ==
Film
Year	Title	Role	Notes
1944	The Tiger Woman	Temple Dancer	Serial [Chs. 1–2], uncredited
1944	The Thin Man Goes Home	Daughter	Uncredited
1945	Forever Yours	Martha	
1946	The Harvey Girls	Louise	Uncredited
1946	Courage of Lassie	Alice Merrick	
1946	I've Always Loved You	Myra Hassman	
1947	That's My Man	Ronnie Grange	
1947	The Fabulous Texan	Alice Sharp	
1948	Old Los Angeles	Marie Marlowe	
1950	So Young, So Bad	Miss [Ruth] Levering	
1952	My Wife's Best Friend	Jane Richards	
1953	Sword of Venus	Claire	
1953	A Blueprint for Murder	Maggie Sargent	
1954	The Outcast	Alice Austin	
1958	Return to Warbow	Kathleen Fallam	
1961	Tammy Tell Me True	Mrs. Bateman	
1961	The Sergeant Was a Lady	Major Hay	
1963	The Virginian	Amy Sturgis	Episode "To Make This Place Remember"
1964	Ride the Wild Surf	Mrs. Kilua	
1976	Lipstick	Vogue Lady	
1994	The Story of Lassie	Herself	Final film

== Sources ==
- Ten Thousand Horses Singing at Internet Movie Database
- Rage for Vengeance at Internet Movie Database
