= Ian Henschke =

Australian journalist

Ian Henschke is the former Chief Advocate for National Seniors Australia. He took up the position in February 2017 and finished in November 2023.

In October 2019 he became Spokesperson for the Alliance for a Fairer Retirement System. This was after Professor Deborah Ralston vacated that position when she was appointed to the federal government's three person Retirement Income Review panel.

In September 2022 he was elected by the alumni to the University of Adelaide Council for a two year term.He was re-elected in August 2024 for a further two year term.

He is a former South Australian television and radio journalist. He reported for 7.30 Report in the 1980s and 1990s and in the late 1990s worked for ABCTV's Landline.

His 4 Corners in 1999 was a documentary on global warming. It won the Jury Prize at the 2000 Grenoble International Film Festival.

https://thoughtmaybe.com/emission-impossible/

He hosted the ABCTV's SA Stateline from 2001 to 2010, ABC radio 891 Mornings from 2011 to 2015, and Drive in 2016. He retired from the ABC in December 2016. He was a regular columnist for The Advertiser's Saturday supplement, SA Weekend (Feb 2009-Nov 2021) He was awarded the Centenary of Federation Medal for Services to Australian Society through Broadcasting.

He was twice named "TV Broadcaster of the Year" in the SA Media Awards, in 2004 and 2009. He was a Walkley Award Finalist in 1991 and 1996 winning a High Commendation for his coverage of the Westpac Letters in 1991. He was named "Radio Broadcaster of the Year" in the 2015 SA Media Awards.

He originally trained as a teacher and returned to secondary teaching as a relief teacher in 2024.

In August 2024 his 25 minute documentary film “The GoldenMile” about 1960 Rome Olympics 1500m champion Herb Elliott and his coach Percy Cerutty was selected as part of the Run Nation Film Festival. It was named best film of the festival and screened across Australia and New Zealand, the UK and USA.

“The Golden Mile” also won Best Sports Report in the 2025 SA Media Awards and Best Biographical Film in the New York International Film Awards.

Career at ABC

Henschke joined the ABC in 1983 and has worked on a range of programs from shows for children to Four Corners. He worked for ABC radio, Radio National, in TV production and online. He is a graduate of the Murray-Darling Leadership Program and has served on the Advisory Board of the Institute for Sustainable Systems and Technology at the University of South Australia. While acting as a Staff-elected Director of the ABC from 2000 to 2002 he worked with the board to obtain $70 million extra funding. He made efforts to secure The Australia Network for the ABC and saw Radio Australia's signal was boosted. During his time on the board the managing director Jonathan Shier was replaced by Russell Balding. He has referred to his two years on the board as "the most important years of my life and some of the most important for the ABC". In 2013 he stood for a position as Staff Elected Director of the ABC again, but was unsuccessful. Veteran Sydney-based current affairs journalist Matt Peacock won the position.

== Education ==
Henschke completed a Bachelor of Arts degree with an Honours in English Language & Literature and has a Diploma of Education from the University of Adelaide. He worked as a teacher before studying at the AFTRS Open Program (under such lecturers as Arch McKirdy and Robert Peach) and then worked on staff at the Australian Film Television and Radio School from 1980 to 1982. He is a graduate of the Murray-Darling Leadership Program. In 1999 he was awarded the inaugural ABC Reuters Foundation Fellowship to Oxford University. He studied carbon sequestration and climate change and produced the documentary Emission Impossible. It was screened on ABCTV and BBC World and won the Grenoble International Film Festival Jury Prize in 2000.
