= Peggy Pryde =

British music hall performer (1867–1876)

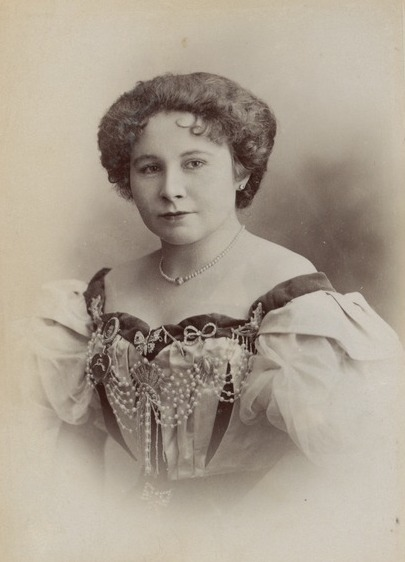
- Peggy Pryde c. 1890s Collection State Library Victoria
- Born: Letitia Matilda Woodley; 19 July 1867; Lambeth, London, England
- Died: 17 May 1943 (aged 75); Randwick, Sydney, Australia
- Occupations: Music hall performer and silent film actress

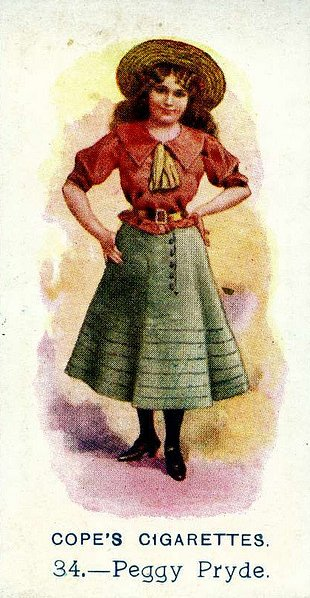
Peggy Pryde on a cigarette card of 1913

Peggy Pryde (born 19 July 1867 (baptised as Letitia Matilda on 14 May 1876 in Lambeth, London, England – 17 May 1943 in Sydney, New South Wales, Australia) was a British music hall performer of the late 19th and early 20th centuries. She appeared in the early Australian talking film Fellers in 1930.

== Biography ==
Pryde was one of three children born to the popular music hall artiste Jenny Hill and John Wilson Woodley (died 8 January 1890), an acrobat who used the stage name Jean Pasta and who later abandoned his wife and young family.

Her first professional appearance was at the Mechanics' Music Hall in Yorkshire in 1877. The same year she went to Dublin and played the General in a stage version of Gulliver’s Travels at the Theatre Royal. She made her London music hall debut at Gatti's "Gatti's-in-the-Road" on Westminster Bridge Road. From 1878 to 1879 she appeared with Wilson Barrett at the Grand Theatre in Leeds. The next two years were spent at the Theatre Royal in Manchester. Pryde appeared in all the leading halls in London and throughout Britain. She was also a favourite in pantomime, appearing at venues throughout Britain for some years. In December 1896 she appeared in a revival of the Edwardian musical comedy The Gay Parisienne with W.H. Denny and Ada Reeve at the Duke of York's Theatre. From 1890 to 1892 she toured the United States:

"Peggy Pryde would probably not have become famous in the variety "perfesh" if she had not been the daughter of that veteran and high priced music hall singer, Jennie Hill. Miss Pryde is pert, vivacious, sprightly and piquant. Her forte is serio-comic business, and she has made a great success of it. She is English, and while she was in New York Jennie Hill, "The Vital Spark," objected to her having her billed as her daughter, but Miss Pryde has now reached that point where she does not require anybody's reflected glory. She is earning money very fast, and is saving it too."

A scene from Two Minutes Silence (1933) - Ethel Gabriel (left), Eva Moss and Peggy Pryde (right)

She married Maurice De Frece, a well-known theatrical agent. In May 1898 Pryde made her Australian debut for Harry Rickards, touring for six months, which required her to delay other engagements: "My Australian and South African engagements having already been made of course I was unable to accept. My season in Africa was a big success and I was re engaged for an extra month the first time I believe such a compliment had been paid to any artist. Indeed at the present time I should be appearing at Syndicate Halls, but they kindly postponed to allow me to play this engagement here."

In 1901 she appeared at the Mile End Empire on the same bill as Dan Leno and Fred Terry. In October 1905 she appeared at Hurtig & Seamon's New (Burlesque) Theater in New York City. She moved permanently to Australia with her second husband George Pearson in 1911. She appeared in a number of venues in Australia into the early 1930s. Pryde appeared in various Australian films, including the 1925 film Painted Daughters. She appeared in Australia's first talking film Fellers (1930) and also in Showgirl's Luck (1931), and Two Minutes Silence (1933).

She died on 17 May 1943 in a private hospital in Sydney and was survived by her husband and her son, Tony.

== Select filmography ==
- Painted Daughters (1925)
- Fellers (1930)
- Showgirl's Luck (1931)
- Two Minutes Silence (1933)
