= Sinara (given name) =

- Pronunciation: /sɪˈnɑːrə/
- Gender: Female

Origin
- Languages: 1. Greek; 2. Arabic
- Meaning: 1. "thistly plant, artichoke" 2. "fiery mouth"

Other names
- Related names: Cynara, Samira

Sinara (also spelled Cynara, Cinara, Synara and Sînnāra; Arabic: سِن نار, romanized: sīn-nāra Greek: Σινάρα, romanized: sinára is an Arabic or Greek given name. In Greek, Sinara or Cynara (Greek: Σινάρα, romanized: sinára) is a feminine given-name, meaning "thistly plant, canine". In Arabic, the feminine name is derived from the root sīn ("tooth") and nār ("divine fire"), ultimately meaning ("teeth of fire"), "the one with a fiery mouth".
