= That's My Man =

1947 film by Frank Borzage

- Film poster
- Directed by: Frank Borzage
- Written by: Steve Fisher; Bradley King
- Produced by: Frank Borzage
- Starring: Don Ameche; Catherine McLeod; Roscoe Karns; John Ridgely; Kitty Irish; Joe Frisco
- Cinematography: Tony Gaudio
- Edited by: Richard L. Van Enger
- Music by: Hans J. Salter
- Production company: Republic Pictures
- Distributed by: Republic Pictures
- Release date: June 1, 1947
- Running time: 99 minutes
- Country: United States
- Language: English
- Budget: $1,373,114

That's My Man is a 1947 American drama film directed by Frank Borzage, written by Steve Fisher and Bradley King, and starring Don Ameche, Catherine McLeod, Roscoe Karns, John Ridgely, Kitty Irish and Joe Frisco. It was released on June 1, 1947, by Republic Pictures.

== Plot ==
Joe Grange quits his job as a Los Angeles accountant and gambles all of his savings on a racehorse named Gallant Man, the longest of longshots. He has his cab driver friend Toby Gleeton bet for him. Meaning well, Gleeton bets everything on the favorite, but Gallant Man wins.

Toby has helped introduce Joe to the love of his life, Ronnie Moore, who puts up with Joe's gambling for a while. But when she expects a child, even Joe's winning of a house does not make her trust his ways. Joe is too busy playing poker to be there when son Richard is born, and he is suckered by horse trainer John Ramsey into betting $40,000 on a race, blowing it all.

Having lost his wife and money, Joe is desperate to put things right. When he hears Ronnie is entering Gallant Man in a $100,000 race at Hollywood Park, he tries to stop her before she loses everything. It turns out she knew exactly what she was doing, and even forgives Joe after their horse's victory.

== Cast ==
- Don Ameche as Joe Grange
- Catherine McLeod as Ronnie Moore / Grange
- Roscoe Karns as Toby Gleeton
- John Ridgely as Ramsey
- Kitty Irish as Kitty
- Joe Frisco as Willie Wagonstatter
- Gregory Marshall as Richard Grange
- Dorothy Adams as Millie
- Frankie Darro as Jockey
- Hampton J. Scott as Sam
- John Miljan as Secretary
- William B. Davidson as Monte
- Joe Hernandez as Race Track Announcer
- Ray Walker as Gambler

== See also ==
- List of films about horse racing
