= Fellers (film) =

1930 film

- Daily Pictorial 23 August 1930
- Directed by: Austin Fay; Arthur Higgins
- Written by: Ashley Druham
- Starring: Arthur Tauchert; Les Coney
- Cinematography: Tasman Higgins
- Music by: Barney Cuthbert
- Production company: Artaus Productions
- Release date: 23 August 1930
- Running time: 8,000 feet
- Country: Australia
- Language: English
- Budget: "several thousand pounds"

Fellers is a 1930 Australian comedy about three friends in the Australian Light Horse during the Palestine Campaign of World War I starring Arthur Tauchert, who was the lead in The Sentimental Bloke (1919). The film is mostly silent with a recorded music score as an accompaniment, but the last reel was synchronised with a few minutes of dialogue and a song.

== Plot ==
Three friends serve in the Australian Light Horse during the Palestine Campaign of World War I. One of them enlisted for excitement; another because he thought he killed a man in a fight over a girl; the third because he thought the girl he loved (Jean Duncan) was in love with another. The second man is killed laying a pipe to supply the army with water.

To save the girl back home from heartbreak (her father has recently died), the third man swaps identification tags with the dead man, and has himself reported as dead. He then finds out that the girl loves him. After the war, the complications are resolved and the third man is reunited with the girl

== Cast ==
- Arthur Tauchert as Roughie
- Jean Duncan as The Girl
- Arthur Clarke
- Joan Milton as A Nurse
- Grace Quine
- Peggy Pryde
- Les Coney
- Arthur Greenaway
- Mrs. G. B. Los Coney
- Fred Barling
- Belle Cole
- Keith Hughes
- Moira Cooney
- Lance Vane
- David L. Delzeil
- George Chalmers
- Stan Odgers

== Production ==
In December 1929 it was announced that a company, Artaus, had been formed to make the film and shooting would begin by January 1930. Filming was pushed forward to qualify for the Commonwealth Government Film Competition. Tasman Higgins and Austin Fay had previously collaborated together on Odds On.

Filming commenced in early 1930 and the film was finished by March. According to Everyones, the filmmakers claimed Fellers "the first Australian picture filmed on Pan K and Pan 2 stock, said to be the most sensitive and fastest working in the world; and that it is the first Australian picture made with noiseless incandescent lighting" and "the first Australian picture that records faithfully the Australian Light Horse in Palestine."

According to the company’s announcement, “supporting players have reduced the Poverty Point congregation by another seventy-four pros, and near-pros.”

Scenes set in the Palestinian desert were shot in sandhills at Kensington near Sydney and in Western New South Wales. The film incorporates documentary footage of the real campaign. The silent sequences were direct by Arthur Higgins and the sound ones by Austin Fay.

The film took eight and a half months to make and featured 208 people.

== Film competition ==
The film was entered in the £10,000 Commonwealth Film competition. It was awarded third prize of £1,500 – no first or second prizes were awarded because the judges felt none of the entries were good enough.

Higgins and Fay argued that their films had been given enough prints under the judging system to warrant the second prize of £2,500 and threatened to sue, but the government did not change its mind.

Fay refused to accept the prize. The issue was raised in Parliament.

Austin Fay requested government assistance and a quota ensuring one Australian film per year, adding "It seems a remarkable fact that every industry in Australia has been assisted from time to time by tariff duties, etc., etc., and yet the greatest money-making industry of the lot, and the one that costs Australia more than any other is being neglected."

The film received little attention from distributors.

== Reception ==
The film premiered at the Theatre Royal in Sydney in August 1930 for a two week season. Arthur Tauchert, les Coney and Grace Quine appeared at some sessions.

It was about ten percent synchronous dialogue with the rest of sound on disk.

=== Critical response ===
Contemporary reviews were poor, the critic from the Sydney Morning Herald (reviewing the film several months before Fellers was commercially released complaining that the film:

Leaves much to be desired. The technique of its production is amateurish; its acting forced and stilted. It has an absurd, trivial story. In its attempts at humour it is stolidly unamusing. The only thing that saves the picture from utter mediocrity is the series of scenes supposed to be taken in the Palestinian deserts... The directors go to endless trouble and expense transporting their apparatus and the members of their company from place to place in order to secure the correct local colour for their stories; yet as regards the plots themselves, and still more as regards the captions, they seem to think that anything will suffice... The plot bristles with absurdities... The change of identification discs in the desert was so puzzling in its consequences that it left the beholders yesterday completely at a loss.

The Sydney Sun said " It is unsophisticated In plot and acting, but some of the scenes are excellent, particularly good being representations of pipe-laying in the desert and photographs of the Light Horse."

Everyone's said:

After the photography has been praised as the best yet seen in an Australian picture, “Fellers” has few points for commendation beyond some shots of the Light Horse in Palestine which constitute neat pieces of camera-craft. The plot is both unconvincing and wearisome; direction is uninspired; the acting weak; the attempts at comedy laborious... Musical synchronisation throughout does not reach standard, and the talking sequence occupies a few minutes at the very end. It is in no way important; moreover the recording is irregular... As a whole “Fellers” shows no advancement over Australian productions of the last few years. In a sound house, this reviewer doubts that the audience will be content with synchronisation; but in an unwired theatre the silent print of “Fellers” may prove a welcome break because its mediocrity will not be so noticeable to an audience which has grown accustomed to lowered silent standards. "

Labor Daily called it "an honest attempt to present the diggers as they really were".

The Daily Pictorial called it "disappointing. The story is rambling, the photography no better than that of the earliest Australian ventures, and the addition of synchronised music and a very brief talkie sequence are serious handicaps."

=== Box office ===
Commercial results appear to have been disappointing. According to Everyone's the film "opened poorly and stayed that way." The same paper claimed "Business so bad that newspaper advertising has been withdrawn and the management is simply sitting back and taking its licking. Free seats issued to the unemployed in the hope of stimulating word-of mouth."

Arthur Tauchert complained about the lack of box office response.

== London release ==
The film was released in England. According to Everyone's, "the London trade press, generally lenient towards Empire efforts, has greeted it with brickbats." Some of the reviews were positive, however.

== Preservation status ==
This is now considered a lost film.

== See also ==
- List of lost films
