= Sunrise (1926 film) =

1926 film

- Everyone's 20 October 1926
- Directed by: Raymond Longford; F. Stuart-Whyte
- Written by: Martyn Keith; Mollie Mead
- Starring: Phyllis du Barry; Robert Travers
- Cinematography: Charles Ellis; Len Roos
- Production companies: Australasian Films; A Master Picture
- Distributed by: Union Theatres
- Release date: 16 October 1926
- Running time: 6,000 feet
- Country: Australia
- Languages: Silent film English intertitles

Sunrise is a 1926 Australian silent film co-directed by Raymond Longford, who took over during filming.

It was the second film from Australasian Films following their recommencement of production, after Painted Daughters. (The company planned to make twelve. It did not make this many ultimately.)

It is considered a lost film.

== Plot ==
During the Gold Rush, miner George Willis loses his unfaithful wife in a rock fall on Mount Sunraise and takes to the bush.

He rescues a girl, Hope Stuart, from a flood and nurses her back to health in his hut. When he brings her back to her father he discovers that an old enemy, Arthur Greerson, has accused him of murder.

Greerson is injured in a mining accident and after George rescues him, Greerson admits he has lied. George returns to his life as a recluse in the mountains, followed by Hope.

== Cast ==
- Phyllis du Barry as Hope Stuart
- Robert Travers as George Willis
- Zara Clinton as Elsa Willis
- Harry Hodson as Old Ben
- Charles Villiers
- Dunstan Webb as Arthur Greerson
- Dick Thonton

== Production ==
The film was shot on location in June 1925 at the Avon Dam near Bargo with interiors at the studios of Australasian Films in Bondi. There was also location work at Burraragong Valley.

F. Stuart Whyte, who had been imported by Australasian Films to direct Painted Daughters, began directing the movie. However he left Australia during shooting for unknown reasons. He was replaced by Longford, who had recently contracted to Australasian Films. (Longford would direct the third Australasian Films movie, The Pioneers.)

Robert Travers, the male lead, almost drowned during filming.

Filming was completed by October 1925.

== Reception ==
According to the Sunday Mail "The cast has been well chosen, and as in the case of Peter Vernon's Silence, the utmost care and skill are shown in the sequences, the cinematography, and the action."

The Bulletin called it "a very fair Australian picture."
