= Those Who Love (1926 film) =

1926 film

- Directed by: Paulette McDonagh; P. J. Ramster
- Written by: Paulette McDonagh
- Produced by: Paulette McDonagh
- Starring: Marie Lorraine; William Carter
- Cinematography: Jack Fletcher
- Production company: MCD Productions
- Distributed by: J. C. Williamson Films
- Release dates: September 1926 (Premiere); 22 November 1926 (Cinema release)
- Running time: 6,000 feet
- Country: Australia
- Languages: Silent film English intertitles
- Budget: £1,000

Those Who Love is a 1926 silent film, produced in Australia, about the son of a knight who falls in love with a dancer. Only part of the film survives today and it is held by the National Film and Sound Archive.

Everyone's called it a "creditable little picture".

== Plot ==
Barry Manton, William Carter, the son of Sir James, falls in love with a dancer, Bebe Doree but his father disapproves and bribes Bebe to disappear. Hurt, Barry leaves home and becomes a labourer on the docks. He meets poor but honest Lola Quayle in a cabaret and offers her a place to live after she resists the advances of a pub owner. They stay in separate rooms but fall in love during a storm and he later marries her. Barry's father wants him to return home and sends a solicitor over to approach him. Not wanting to get between Barry and his family, Lola runs away.

Years later, Barry lives in an attic, having rejected wealth and position and taken to drink, while Lola works as a nurse, looking after their son, Peter. Barry is injured and Lola recognises him at hospital. She visits Sir James and asks for money for a specialist and the family is united.

== Cast ==
- Marie Lorraine as Lola Quayle
- William Carter as Barry Manton
- Robert Purdie as Sir James Manton
- Sylvia Newland as Bebe Doree
- George Dean as Parker
- Kate Trefle as Lady Manton
- Big Bill Wilson as Ace Skinner
- Charles Beetham as Austin Mann
- Reginald Reeves as Sir Furneaux Reeves
- Jackie Williamson as Peter
- Nellie Ferguson as nurse
- Howard Harris as doctor
- Edith Hodgson
- Herbert Walton

== Production ==
This was the first feature film from the McDonagh sisters, Paulette, Phyllis and Isobel. They came up with the story in the prep room of their own boarding school. Says Phyllis McDonagh:

In those days every Australian-made film made us out to be a lot of bushwhackers, on the 'Dad and Dave' theme. The three of us talked and talked and decided if Australia was going to compete overseas we'd have to meet overseas standards by making interior films – technically difficult then.

The film was entirely financed by the girl's father. Says Phyllis:

Father always believed in us. And when we proved on paper we knew what we were about, he let us have our head. We had a down-to-earth approach. We thought well ahead and planned the details meticulously. We knew talent wasn't enough if it was half baked.

The McDonaghs formed a production company, MCD Productions, and started pre-production. Isobel was to star, Phyllis was to do production design and publicity, and Paulette would help with direction. Before filming commenced, their father died of a heart attack. Their mother was a trained nurse and a group of Sydney doctors suggested she open a convalescent home for their use. The family moved into "Drummoyne House", a 22-room house in the Sydney suburb of Drummoyne built by convicts. Two wings were set aside for the convalescent home and another section was turned into a film studio.

The McDonaghs originally hired P. J. Ramster to direct but were unhappy with his work and replaced him with Paulette. The interiors were shot mostly at the home in Drummoyne, with additional scenes filmed at the Bondi studios of Australasian Films and exteriors done around Sydney.

Shooting took four weeks in all. A number of days were lost when the cast and crew's eyes were damaged from the lights, and their cinematographer fell ill with influenza.

== Release ==
The film was given a vice-regal premiere in September 1926 attended by Governor Sir Dudley de Chair, whose daughter Elaine had a part in the film. Dr McDonagh had been J. C. Williamson's surgeon and the film was distributed commercially by J. C. Williamson Ltd It performed well at the box office, with Phyllis McDonagh later claiming the movie earned twice its cost.

Gregory Balcombe of Union Theatres said his company distributed the film to help the local industry, although it should not have cost more than £1,000.
