= Arch McKirdy =

Australian radio broadcaster

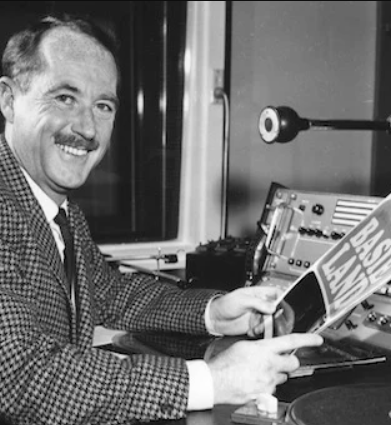
- Born: Archibald William McKirdy; 17 March 1924; Swan Hill, Victoria
- Died: 26 August 2013 (aged 89); New South Wales
- Occupation(s): Jazz radio presenter Voice coach Broadcasting executive
- Known for: Relax with Me; Captain Fortune Show

Arch McKirdy (17 March 1924 – 26 August 2013) was an Australian radio broadcaster, voice trainer, mentor and executive, who was best known for his evening jazz program Relax with Me, "Australia's most popular radio program" in the 1960s and early 1970s.

== Early life and career ==
McKirdy was born Archibald William McKirdy in Swan Hill, Victoria in 1924. His parents were Archibald William McKirdy, Senior and Jessie Isabel Chadwick. His father ran country dances and encouraged his son to play the drums and guitar.

In 1941, at the age of 17, he auditioned for the position of cadet announcer at radio station 3TR in Sale, Victoria.

With the coming of World War II he moved briefly to radio station 3SH in Swan Hill for several months and then joined the army. He would later move to the army's entertainment unit and toured the South Pacific entertaining the Australian troops at the war front. While in the army he would meet some of Australia's top jazz musicians of the period.

== Relax with Me ==
After the war McKirdy completed a music appreciation course and then, after another period at 3TR in Sale, moved to Sydney where he was employed by radio station 2UW in the late 1950s (at least from 1956 until 1960). In June 1963 he was hosting the evening show Starlight with Arch McKirdy on radio station 2GB and in December of that year he was compering Relax with Arch McKirdy jazz music program on the same station . Relax with Me was being broadcast on 2SM in July 1963.

In 1964 McKirdy was persuaded by the broadcasting executive Clement Semmler to bring his jazz program from the commercial station over to the ABC. For many years McKirdy would present his smooth, mellow and low key blend of jazz standards and guide listeners through such greats as "Benny Golson or Oscar Peterson or Charlie Parker". At the beginning of each program he would invite his audience to "relax with me".

From 1962 McKirdy also concurrently worked as the lead compere, under the name of "Uncle Mac", of ATN-7's children's television program, the Captain Fortune Show and in a similar role on the successor program, The Land of Make Believe.

In the same period he was a promoter of jazz concerts featuring Australian musicians such as Don Burrows and Judy Bailey.

In December 1972 McKirdy, at the age of 48, ended his association with Relax with Me and accepted a promotion to a management role with the ABC, namely Director of Radio Presentation. The jazz program would continue under a new name, Music to Midnight, and with new presenters: first, with Ian Neil, and then in the mid-1980s with Ralphe Rickman.

== ABC management ==
In his new role McKirdy became a voice teacher and mentor to many ABC presenters, including Norman Swan, Margaret Throsby, Geraldine Doogue and Fran Kelly, teaching them not only how to speak with the received pronunciation of standard English but how to speak naturally "in groups of words, breathing and pausing naturally" and speak to their audience as if they were talking to a personal friend.

In 1978 he was appointed to perform an extra role, that of Managing Director of the ABC-FM radio networks which included being the director of the just created ABC-FM station in Adelaide.

== Late career ==
In the early years of the new century McKirdy worked with the Special Broadcasting Service (SBS), training its ethnic presenters to speak more naturally and helping video journalists speak "to viewers as if they were on location". He also performed a similar role at the Australian Film and Television School, where people he trained included Ian Henschke.

== Legacy ==
McKirdy was variously called a "magnificent jazz compere" and "a discerning and reliably informed jazz broadcaster". The magazine Jazz Notes pointed out that he had "no trouble persuading hundreds of thousands to 'Relax with Me' ". In 1972 his program had "the largest national radio audience in Australia" with "about 400,000" Australians listening in "at least once a week". and was "Australia's longest running personality radio show". Margaret Throsby recalled that "Arch's program was a fixture: at 10 o'clock at night everyone would start listening to Relax with Me".

For writer and comedian John Doyle, delivering the 2005 Andrew Olle Media Lecture, "Arch always struck a warm yet authoritative tone. He was a master of the medium having the easy confidence of one who has made the time, the moment, his own and he knew his subject and somehow gave the impression of having left the ego behind."

McKirdy, along with Semmler, Eric Child, Kym Bonython and a few others, successfully fought for a place for jazz music on the ABC in the 1960s and 1970s, which hitherto had been largely ignored by the national broadcaster's senior management.

== Personal life ==
McKirdy was married twice: first, to Frances with whom he had three sons, Grant, Mark and John, and second, to Margaret with whom he had a daughter, Megan. A grandson, Lewis McKirdy, was a broadcaster at the ABC radio station Triple J and currently lives in the United Kingdom.

He died on 26 August 2013 at the age of 89.
