= Beatrice Tildesley =

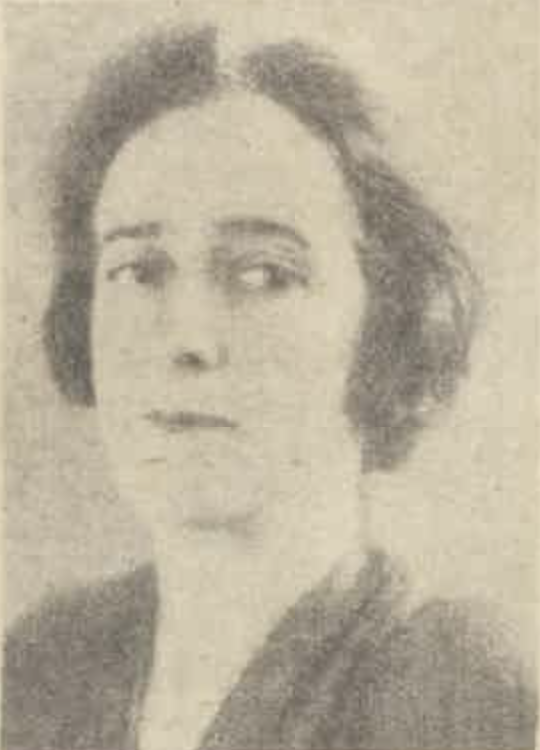
- Tildesley, film critic for The Australian Women's Weekly, 1934
- Born: Beatrice Maude Tildesley; 27 September 1886; Willenhall, Staffordshire, England
- Died: 26 January 1977 (aged 90); Rose Bay, New South Wales, Australia
- Occupations: Film and theatre critic, actor

Beatrice Maude Tildesley (27 September 1886 – 26 January 1977) was an Australian critic of theatre, film and art. She was also an educator and amateur actress.

== Early life and birth ==
Beatrice Maude Tildesley was born on 27 September 1886 at Willenhall in Staffordshire, England. Her parents were Rebecca (née Fisher) and manufacturer William Henry Tildesley. After completing secondary education at King Edward VI High School for Girls in Birmingham, she attended Girton College at the University of Cambridge, studying classics for three years to 1909.

== Career ==
Tildesley began her teaching career at Burton-on-Trent High School in 1910 and moved to Redland High School for Girls in Bristol in 1912.

She followed her older sister, Evelyn (1882–1976), to Sydney in 1915. She taught classics at Normanhurst School in Ashfield where her sister was the principal. She and her sister joined the Sydney Repertory Theatre Society in 1920. She appeared in John Galsworthy's new play, Loyalties, in 1922. The Sydney Morning Herald critic wrote that she "conveyed amusingly the idea of Margaret Orme's volatile and flighty personality".

A visit to England in 1923 gave the sisters financial independence.

In 1922–1924 Tildesley served as theatre critic for Forum: A Journal for Thinking Australians. She later wrote theatre and film reviews for The Triad, The Bulletin, Beckitt's Budget and The Home.

As a member of the National Council of Women of New South Wales, Tildesley joined the Good Films League in the mid-1920s. She appeared at a Film Commission hearing in 1927 where she expressed her disgust for Hollywood films. She believed that films should be categorised if suitable for children and asked that a woman be appointed to a censorship board.

In 1930 she supported Doris Fitton in the establishment of the Independent Theatre.

In 1931 Beatrice Tildesley co-founded Australia's first film society, named the Film Society of Australia.

Its constitution included the following:

Recognising the importance of the moving pictures as affecting ideals of taste, speech and conduct, and as a medium of knowledge; recognising also that their social and artistic tradition is still in course of development; and believing that they possess possibilities hitherto undeveloped and qualities that are often misused, the society aims at encouraging the production and screening of films:

a. Whose speech and subject matter reflect life that embodies the traditions and ideals, first of British civilisation, and next of the other great civilisations of the world, without continually stressing the poorer aspects of any national life;

b. That reach a higher artistic standard both in content and methods of representation;

c. That avoid, in particular, falsity, crude sentimentality and vulgarity generally.

== Death ==
Tildesley died on 26 January 1977 at Rose Bay, New South Wales and was cremated. Her sister Evelyn predeceased her.
