= Cynara (disambiguation) =

Cynara is a genus of perennial plants.

Cynara may also refer to:

- A woman in Ernest Dowson's poem Non Sum Qualis eram Bonae Sub Regno Cynarae, first published in 1894
- Cynara (Delius), a musical setting by Frederick Delius of the poem
- Cynara (play), a 1930s London and Broadway production written by H. M. Harwood and Robert Gore-Browne
- Cynara (1932 film), based on the play and starring Ronald Colman
- Cynara (2023 film), a Canadian documentary directed by Sherien Barsoum
- "Cynara", a song by the industrial band Clan of Xymox
- Cynara Coomer, South African surgeon and medical journalist
- Cynara (1927 a Camper & Nicholsons gaff-rigged ketch)

== See also ==
- Senara (disambiguation)
- Sinara (disambiguation)
- Synara San, a character in the animated television series Star Wars Resistance
