= Marie Lorraine =

Australian actress (1899–1982)

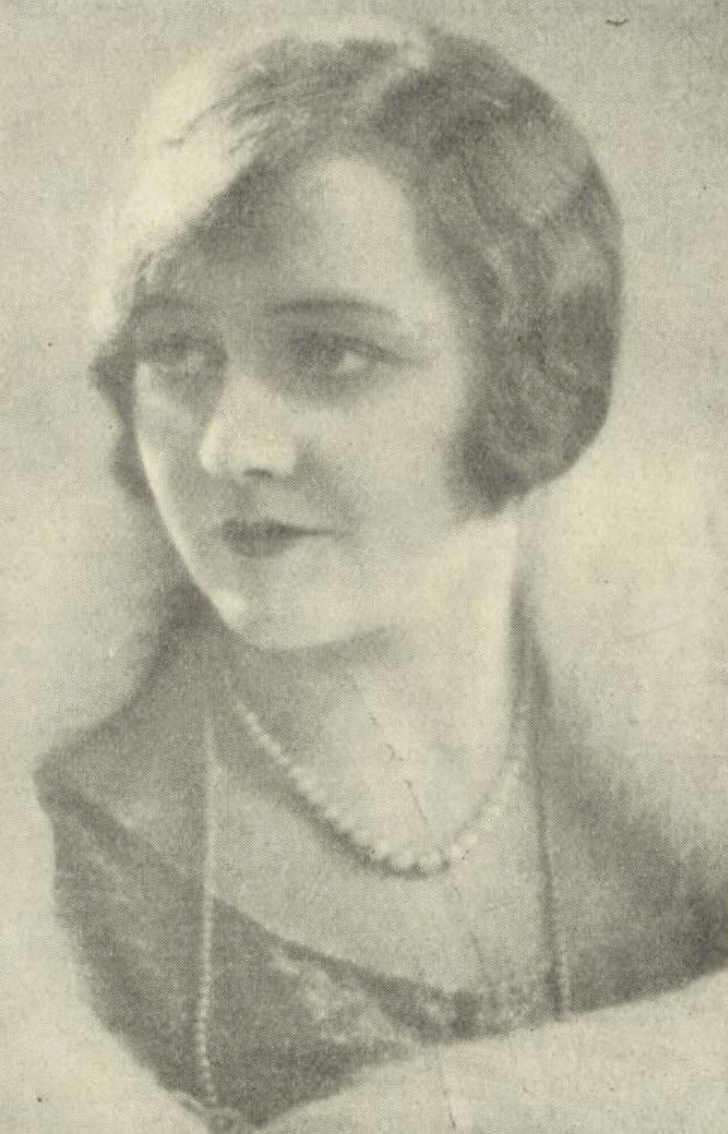
- Lorraine in 1928
- Born: Isabella (Isabel) Mercia McDonagh; 3 January 1899; Sydney, New South Wales, Australia
- Died: 5 March 1982 (aged 83); London, England
- Occupation: Actress
- Children: 3
- Relatives: Phyllis McDonagh (sister), Paulette McDonagh (sister)

Isabella Mercia McDonagh (3 January 1899 – 5 March 1982), also known as Marie Lorraine, was an Australian actress who often worked in collaboration with her sisters Paulette and Phyllis. Isabella, alongside her two sisters made history by owning and running a film production company, therefore becoming the first Australian women to do so.

She visited Hollywood in 1933.

== Early life ==
Isabella Mercia McDonagh was born 3 January 1899 at Macquaire Street in Sydney, Australia, becoming one of seven children born to John McDonagh, a medical practitioner, and Annie Jane (née Amora). Since her father was a surgeon to a theatrical company, she was familiar with the entertainment industry and as a young girl, showed an interest in acting. She entered the film industry with her sisters Paulette, writer and director of all their films, and Phyllis who became the art director, publicist and producer. She died on 5 March 1982.

== Awards ==
- Isabella Mercia McDonagh was inducted onto the Victorian Honour Roll of Women in 2001.
- Isabella and her sisters Paulette and Phyllis were recipients of the 1978 Raymond Longford award (Australian Film Institute)

== Partial filmography ==
- Joe (1924)
- Painted Daughters (1925)
- Those Who Love (1926)
- The Far Paradise (1928)
- The Cheaters (1930)
- Two Minutes Silence (1933)
