= Lewis McKirdy =

Australian radio announcer

Lewis McKirdy (born 12 October 1987) is the outgoing host of Lunch on triple j.
