= The Cheaters (1930 film) =

1930 film

- Directed by: Paulette McDonagh
- Written by: Paulette McDonagh
- Produced by: Paulette McDonagh
- Starring: Marie Lorraine; Arthur Greenaway; John Faulkner; Josef Bambach
- Cinematography: Jack Fletcher
- Production company: McDonagh Productions
- Release date: 1 June 1930
- Running time: 94 minutes
- Country: Australia
- Language: English

The Cheaters is a 1930 Australian silent film directed by Paulette McDonagh and starring Isabel McDonagh (professionally known as Marie Lorraine). Phyllis McDonagh worked as art director. The McDonagh sisters made a number of self-funded films together in the late 1920s and early 1930s.

Originally the film's length was 6000 feet plus, it survives at 6309 feet (94 mins. at 18 frame/s).

== Plot summary ==
An embezzler, Bill Marsh (Arthur Greenaway), works with his daughter Paula (Marie Lorraine), who serves as a bait, robbing wealthy people. Bill also seeks revenge on a businessman, John Travers (John Faulkner), but Paula falls in love with Travers' son Lee (Josef Bambach) and begins to have doubts about her life of crime. Eventually, Paula reforms and marries Lee.

== Cast ==
- Marie Lorraine (Isabel McDonagh) as Paula Marsh
- Arthur Greenaway as Richard Marsh
- John Faulkner as John Travers
- Leal Douglas as the Lady
- Josef Bambach as Lee Travers
- Nellie McNiven as Mrs Hugh Nash
- Elaine de Chair as Louise Nash
- Frank Hawthorne as Keith Manion
- Reg Quartly as Jan

== Production ==
The film was shot as a silent movie in 1929 but had trouble securing a release. The McDonaghs decided to adapt it into a partial talkie and shot some additional scenes in Melbourne in 1930 using an improvised sound-on-disc system. These scenes included a fancy dress party sequence and a romantic scene where Paula sings a song to Lee. The film features a shot of the not yet completed Sydney Harbour Bridge.

The musician's union temporarily prevented its members from recording music for the film. The McDonaghs responded by hiring non-union labour.

== Release ==
In May 1930 the film was entered in the first Commonwealth Government Film Competition but failed to win a prize. It did not perform well at the box office due in part to the poor quality of its sound recording.

The critic from the Sydney Morning Herald was not enthusiastic about the movie's quality:

The Misses McDonagh's latest film... is not as interesting as their last production, The Far Paradise. For one thing, they have slavishly copied American models. Instead of striving to give their work originality, the Americanisms, "big boy", "dame", and '"gangster", creep into the captions. For The Cheaters is, through the greater part of its length, a silent film... the use of captions seem strained and artificial... The Cheaters suffers from a poor, badly-told story. Especially toward the end, absurdities spring up in battalions. The piece of dialogue that brings the picture to a close is an extreme example of bathos... The acting of the cast... is weak, and it goes at too slow a tempo, flying to the other extreme from the fault of jerky rapidity that used to mar local productions. The best feature of the film lies in its settings.

National Film and Sound Archive comments:

Filmed with a careful eye for detail on location in Sydney and at the McDonagh family home, Drummoyne House, the picture shows evidence of the McDonagh sisters' understanding of mood and atmosphere. This is one of Australia's major surviving silents. Completed as a silent in early 1929, the film was redone as a partial talkie because of distribution difficulties, and used sound on disc with some scenes re-shot. The film was redone again with an optical soundtrack on a Standardtone system.
