= The Far Paradise =

1928 film

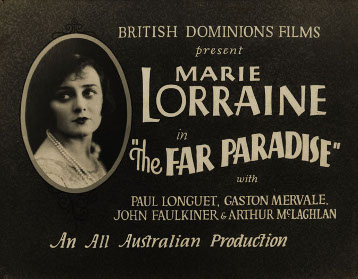
- Directed by: Paulette McDonagh
- Written by: Paulette McDonagh
- Produced by: Paulette McDonagh
- Starring: Marie Lorraine; Gaston Mervale
- Cinematography: Jack Fletcher
- Production company: MCD Productions
- Distributed by: British Dominion Films (Aust); Universal Pictures (UK)
- Release dates: 14 July 1928; 1930 (UK)
- Running time: 85 minutes (7,000 feet)
- Country: Australia
- Budget: £2,000

The Far Paradise is a 1928 Australian silent film directed by Paulette McDonagh and starring Marie Lorraine the stage name of Isabel McDonagh. This is the second feature from the McDonagh sisters.

Graham Shirley in Australian Cinema commented: "...one of the best-directed of all Australian features prior to the coming of sound."

== Plot ==
In the town of Kirkton, James Carson is involved in crime and is investigated by the Attorney-General, Howard Lawton. Carson's daughter Cherry falls in love with Lawton's son Peter, and Lawton forbids the relationship. James Carson goes into hiding, taking Cherry with him.

A year later Peter finds Cherry selling flowers in a mountain tourist resort, trying to support her now-alcoholic father. Carson dies of a heart attack and Cherry can marry Peter.

== Cast ==
- Marie Lorraine as Cherry Carson
- Gaston Mervale as James Carson
- Arthur McLaglen as Karl Rossi
- John Faulkner as Howard Lawton
- Paul Longuet as Peter Lawton
- Arthur Clarke as Lee Farmer
- Harry Halley as Brock

== Production ==
The death of the McDonaghs' father left them £500 in debt after their first film. However a rich uncle of theirs died in Chile, enabling them to start a second movie.

Shooting began in March 1928. The film's interiors were shot at the McDonagh family home, Drummoyne House, Sydney, and the exteriors in the Burragorang Valley and the Bondi studios of Australasian Films, plus some shots done in Melbourne.

== Reception ==
The film was well reviewed and performed strongly at the box office.

According to Everyone's it was one of the more successful Australian films of 1928 and made a profit.

== Notes ==
- The Far Paradise at the NSFA
- The Argus, Melbourne, Saturday 21 April 1928.
