= Paulette McDonagh =

Australian film director

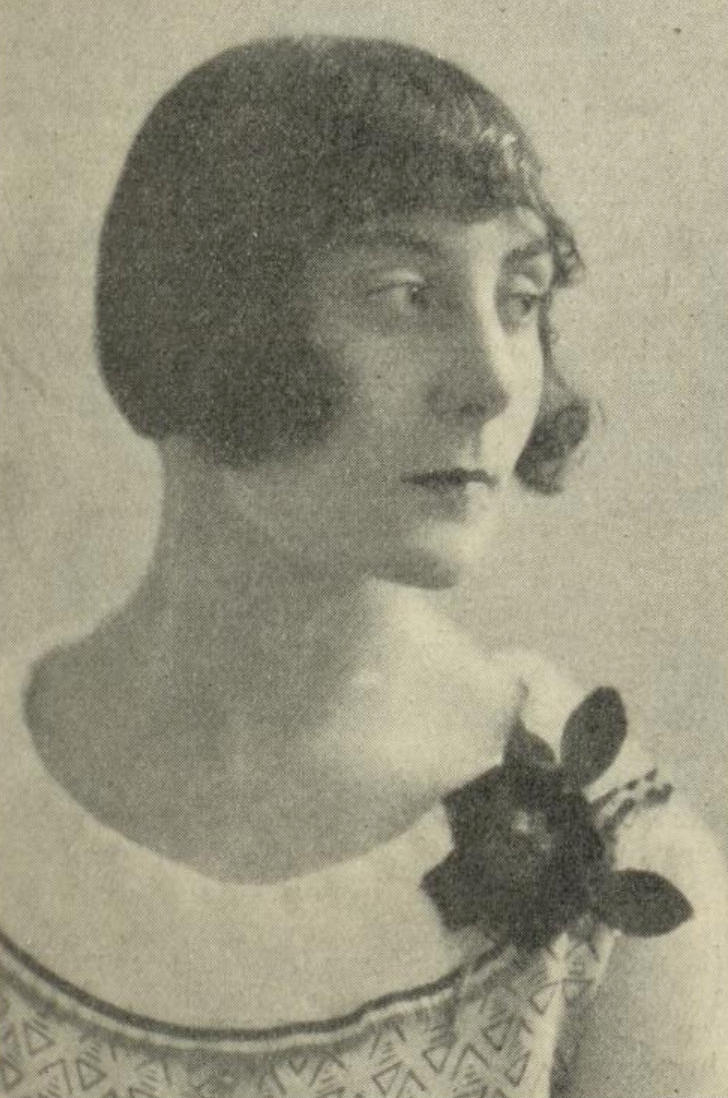
- McDonagh in 1928
- Born: Paulette de Vere McDonagh; June 11, 1901; Sydney, New South Wales, Australia
- Died: August 30, 1978 (aged 77)
- Occupation: Film director
- Relatives: Marie Lorraine (sister), Phyllis McDonagh (sister)

Paulette de Vere McDonagh (11 June 1901 – 30 August 1978) was an Australian film director, who often worked in collaboration with her sisters Phyllis McDonagh and Isabel McDonagh (aka Marie Lorraine). In 1933 it was claimed she was one of only five female film directors in the world.

At one stage the sisters had offers to go to Hollywood. "Fox Films offered to send us," said Phyllis McDonagh, "...but we were sensible girls. We sat down and talked and decided we would end up very small fish in a big pond. At home we had work and a reputation."

== Early life ==
Paulette McDonagh was born on 11 June 1901 in Sydney and is the third of seven children born to Annie Jane (Anita) Amora and John Michael McDonagh.

She was educated at the Catholic Kincoppal School in Elizabeth Bay, Sydney.

== Career ==
Paulette worked alongside her sisters Isabel and Phyllis to create and produce films through the 1920s and 1930s, and together they are considered "the first women to own and operate a film production company in Australia."

Paulette was the youngest of the three and worked as writer and director, while Phyllis acted as publisher and promoter and Isabel starring as an actress. Growing up in a bohemian and wealthy family, their home was a lavish back drop for most of their films, filled with antique furniture and rich colours.

Their first silent film, Those Who Love (1926), was funded privately by their family. Paulette took over the position of directing the screenplay when creative differences with P. J. Ramster broke out. The sisters' risk-taking attempt at film making paid off when the publication, Everyone's, gave them a rave review stating:

"The result is a dazzling triumph and which is said to be the best Australian film that has yet graced the screen. A Sydney girl whose histrionic ability is remarkable. Her splendid performance ranks with some of the best characterizations ever given to the screen by the world’s greatest stars."

In the wake of the financial success of Those Who Love, the McDonagh sisters followed up with further silent films including The Far Paradise (1928), and The Cheaters (1930).

The Far Paradise was a box office hit and acclaimed for its fine art techniques that were influenced not just by Australian film, but also Hollywood melodrama and German expressionism.

The melodramatic influences allowed for overacting on Isabel's part while Phyllis and Paulette were able to create longer screen time for her to perform on her own. Isabel acted as a more interesting heroine than was common in most films of its time. Paulette the director had Isabel acting in different situations such as breaking and entering, cracking safes, and even in the arms of a lover. During this time period it was outside of the norm to show a woman on screen performing such roles, but this gave their silent films depth and a following of a greater and more appreciative crowd.

Despite their small budget, the sisters, and especially Paulette, were able to create society melodramas involving romance, sacrifice, and parental opposition.

When Isabel and Phyllis retired from the film industry for various reasons, Paulette found it difficult to continue her work alone despite her efforts to persevere. In 1934 she took a job to work on a romantic epic based on the life of the Reverend John Flynn. With a budgetary shortfall and having no one to act or produce the film, Paulette was forced to drop the job.

With her film career ending, she continued to live with her younger siblings. Paulette died in Sydney on 30 August 1978.

== Awards ==
- In 1978, Paulette received the Raymond Longford award (Australian Film Institute) in, alongside her sisters Isabel and Phyllis.
- In 2001, Paulette was inducted onto the Victorian Honour Roll of Women.

== Select filmography ==
- The Mystery of the Hansom Cab (1925) – extra
- Those Who Love (1926)
- The Far Paradise (1928)
- The Cheaters (1930)
- Australia in the Swim (1931) – documentary
- How I Play Cricket (1931) – documentary
- The Mighty Conqueror (1932) – documentary
- The Trail of the Roo (1932) – documentary
- Two Minutes Silence (1933)
