= 1930 in Australia =

- Decades: 1910s; 1920s; 1930s; 1940s; 1950s
- See also: 1930 in Australian literature; Other events of 1930; Timeline of Australian history

The following lists events that happened during 1930 in Australia.

1930 in Australia
- Monarch: George V
- Governor-General: John Baird, Baronet Stonehaven
- Prime minister: James Scullin
- Population: 6,462,610
- Elections: SA, WA, NSW

== Incumbents ==
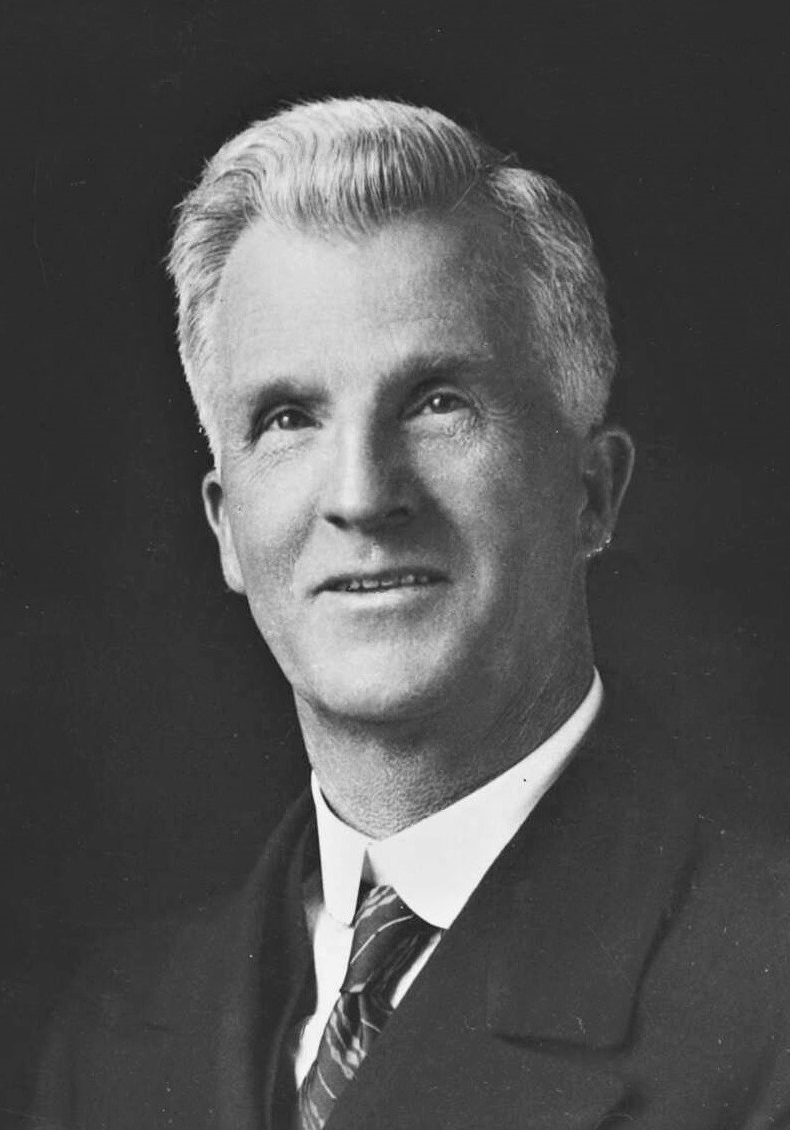
James Scullin

- Monarch – George V
- Governor-General – John Baird, Baronet of Stonehaven
- Prime Minister – James Scullin
- Chief Justice – Adrian Knox (until 18 March) then Isaac Isaacs

== State premiers ==
- Premier of New South Wales – Thomas Bavin (until 4 November), then Jack Lang
- Premier of Queensland – Arthur Edward Moore
- Premier of South Australia – Richard Layton Butler (until 17 April), then Lionel Hill
- Premier of Tasmania – John McPhee
- Premier of Victoria – Edmond Hogan
- Premier of Western Australia – Philip Collier (until 24 April), then Sir James Mitchell

=== State governors ===
- Governor of New South Wales – Sir Dudley de Chair
- Governor of Queensland – Sir John Goodwin
- Governor of South Australia – Sir Alexander Hore-Ruthven
- Governor of Tasmania – Sir James O'Grady
- Governor of Victoria – Arthur Somers-Cocks, 6th Baron Somers
- Governor of Western Australia – Sir William Campion

== Events ==
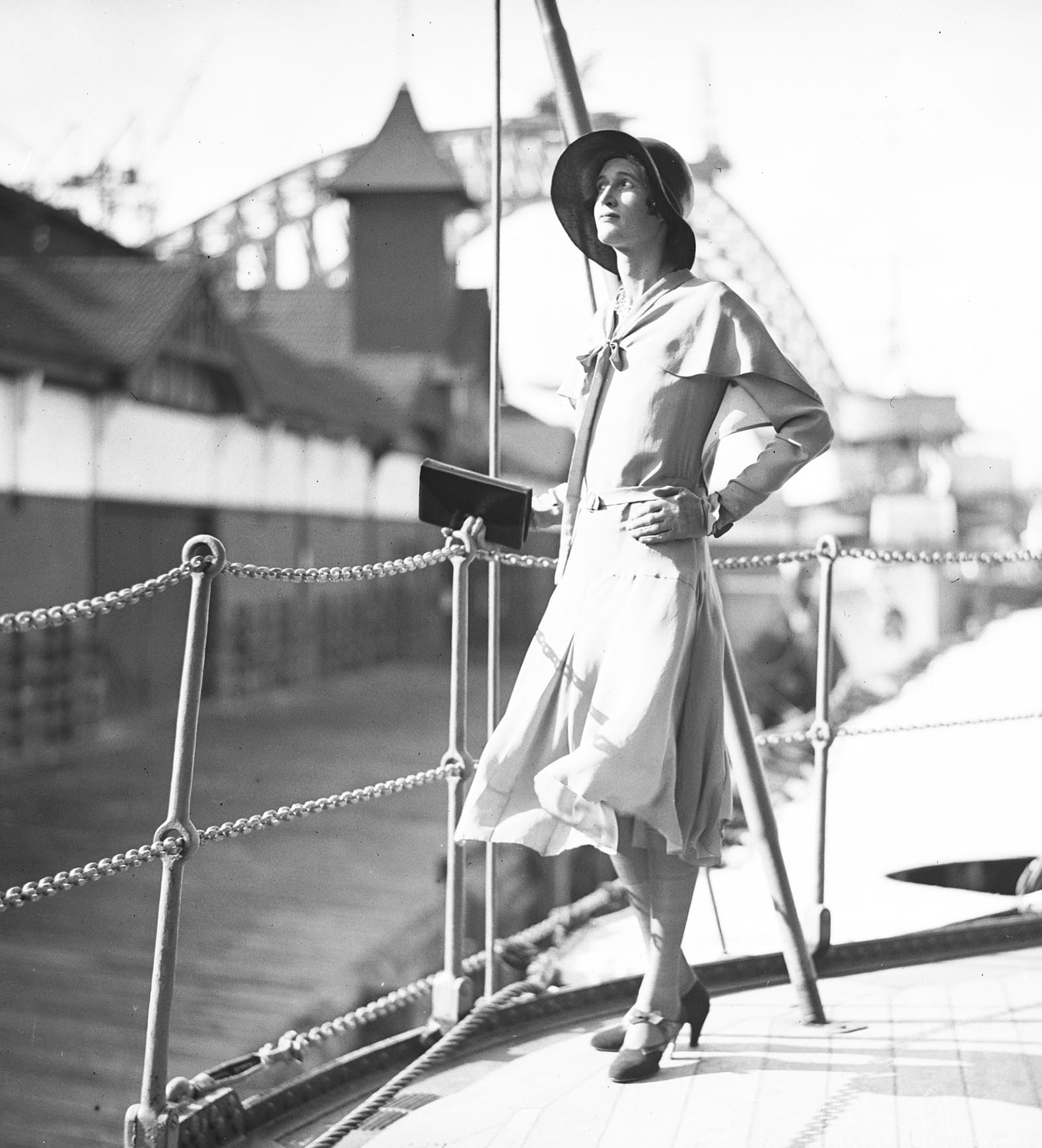
Designer and socialite Hera Roberts on the deck of the HNLMS JAVA, Sydney Harbour, 1930

- 11 November – The Shrine of Remembrance in Brisbane is dedicated.

== Sport ==
- 6 January – Don Bradman scores a record 452 not out in one cricket innings.
- 25 January – Harry Hopman and Jack Crawford win the Australian Doubles Championship at Kooyong, Victoria.
- 4 October - The 1930 NSWRFL season culminates in Western Suburbs' 27–2 victory over St. George in the premiership final, marking Western Suburbs' first premiership since the club was founded in 1908.
- 11 October - The VFL Grand Final was won by the Collingwood Football Club, defeating the Geelong Football Club by 30 points, establishing an as yet unbeaten record in consecutive premierships in Australian Rules football's premier league.,
- 4 November – Phar Lap wins the Melbourne Cup.
- The Australia national rugby league team completed the 1929–30 Kangaroo tour of Great Britain.

== Births ==
=== January - February ===
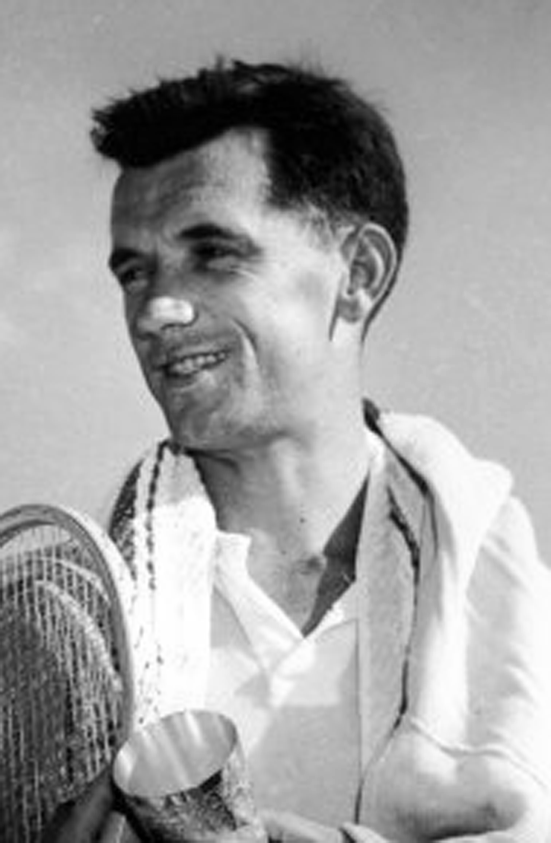
Mervyn Rose

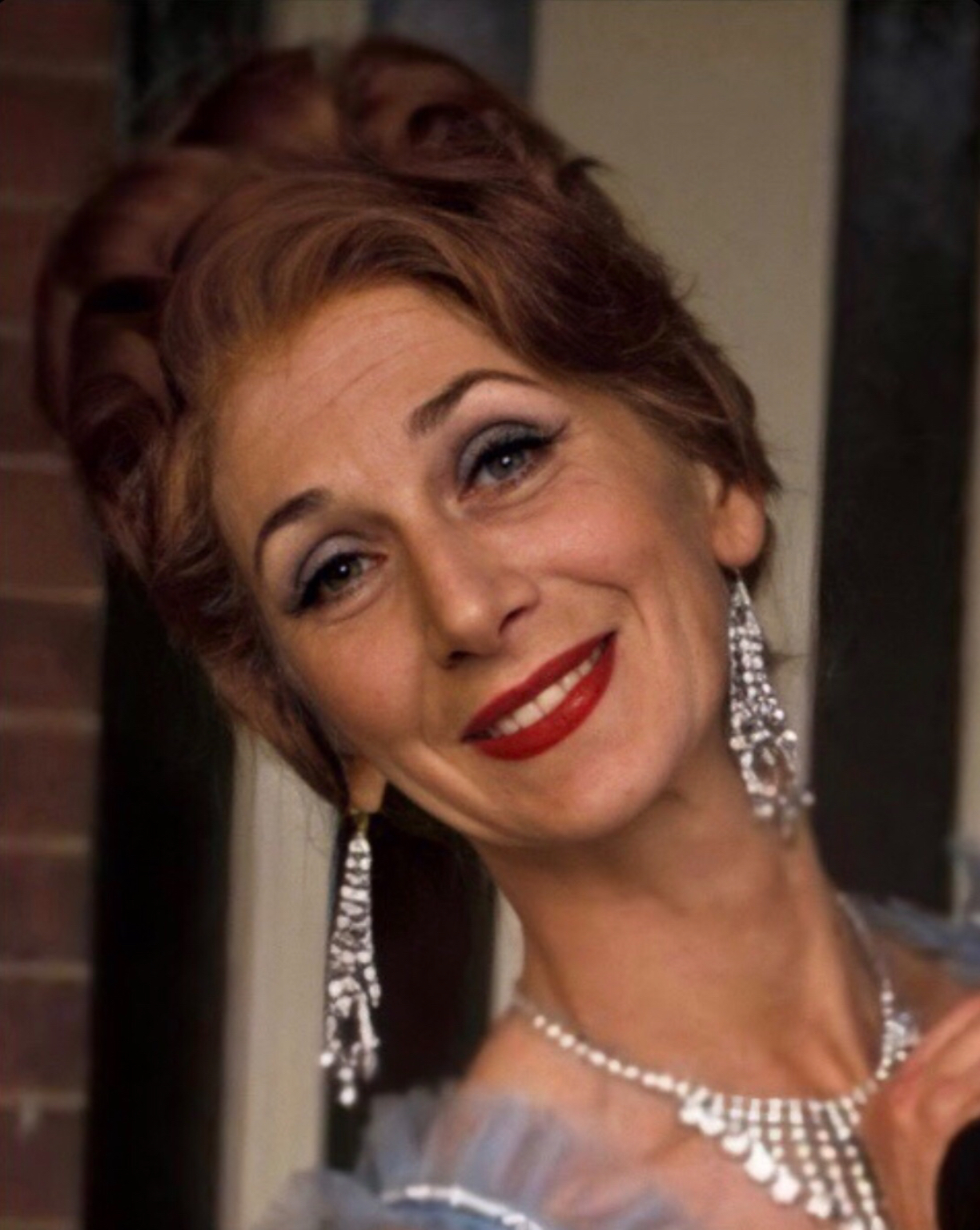
Diane Holland

- 11 January
  - Ron Mulock, 10th Deputy Premier of New South Wales (d. 2014)
  - Rod Taylor, actor (d. 2015)
- 12 January – Ewan Cameron, Victorian politician
- 14 January – Joy McKean, country singer-songwriter (d. 2023)
- 19 January – Don Kendell, businessman (d. 2001)
- 21 January – Arthur Tonkin, Western Australian politician (d. 2022)
- 23 January – Mervyn Rose, tennis player (d. 2017)
- 26 January – Richard Killen, New South Wales politician (d. 2012)
- 28 January – A. David Buckingham, chemist (d. 2021)
- 9 February – Robert Bropho, Indigenous rights activist and convicted sex offender (d. 2011)
- 12 February – Jim Ramsay, Victorian politician (d. 2013)
- 15 February – Bruce Dawe, poet (d. 2020)
- 21 February – Elsa Klensch, journalist and television presenter (d. 2022)
- 22 February – Max Smith, New South Wales politician (d. 2020)
- 26 February – Les McMahon, New South Wales politician (d. 2015)
- 27 February – Joe Riordan, New South Wales politician (d. 2012)
- 27 February – Diane Holland, actress (d. 2009)

=== March - April ===
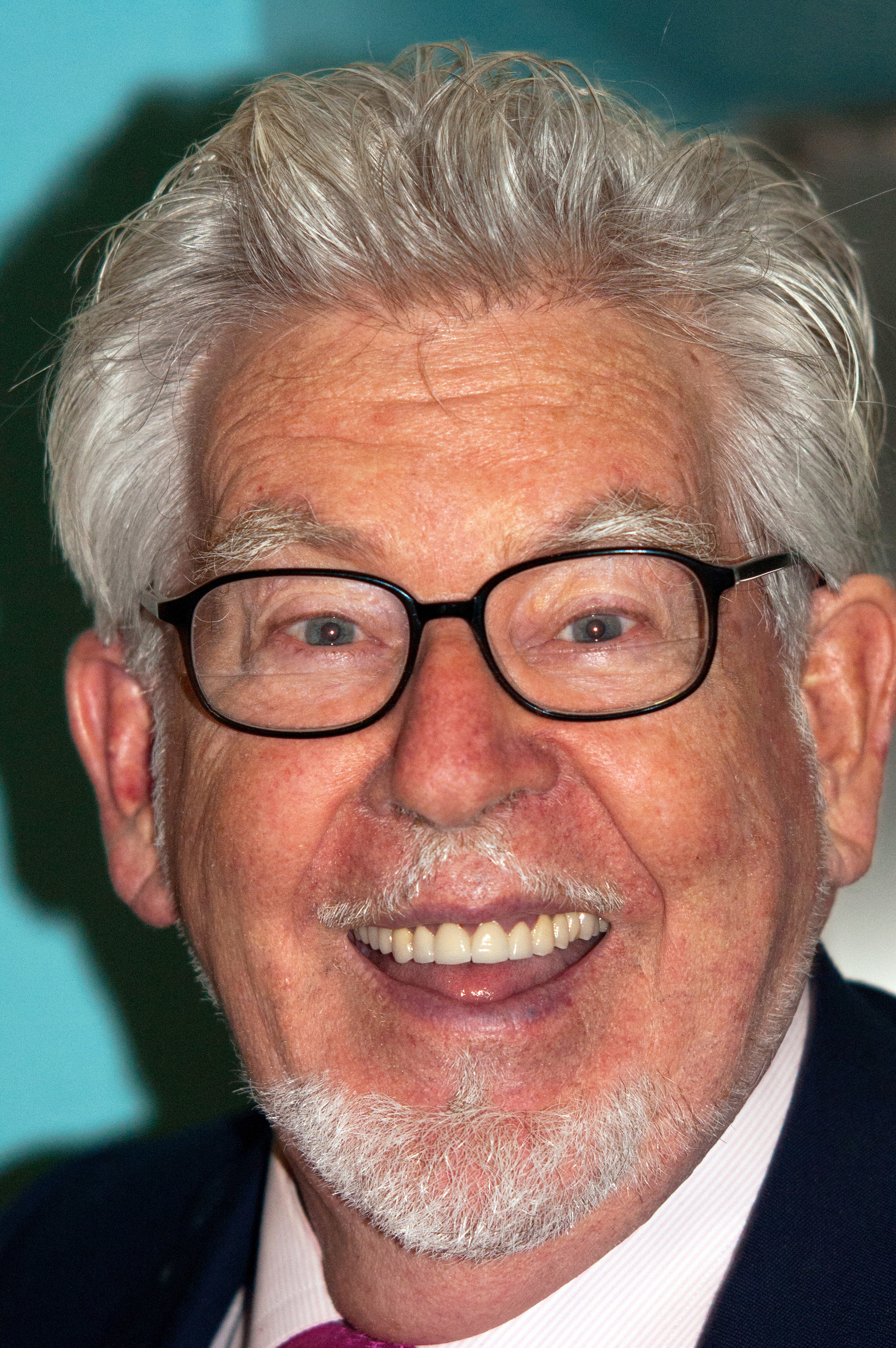
Rolf Harris

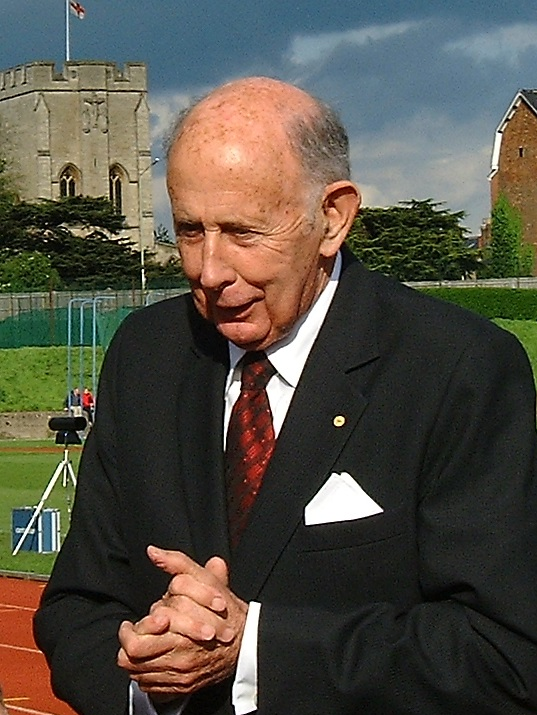
John Landy

- 1 March – Doris Goddard, cabaret singer and actress (d. 2019)
- 4 March – John Toohey, High Court justice (d. 2015)
- 5 March – John Miles, Victorian politician (d. 2010)
- 11 March – Geoffrey Blainey, historian
- 14 March – Ray Flockton, cricketer (d. 2011)
- 18 March – Joan Chambers, Victorian politician (d. 2016)
- 19 March – Pat Hanlon, Queensland politician (d. 2014)
- 23 March – Owen Harries, academic and magazine editor (born in the United Kingdom) (d. 2020)
- 29 March – John Marshall, Olympic swimmer (d. 1957)
- 30 March – Rolf Harris, entertainer, musician and convicted sex offender (d. 2023)
- 5 April – Bob Fell, Victorian politician (d. 2009)
- 11 April
  - John Hyde, Australian rules footballer (Geelong) (d. 2020)
  - Peter Toogood, golfer (d. 2019)
- 12 April
  - John Landy, 26th Governor of Victoria and Olympic athlete (d. 2022)
  - Nancy Lyons, Olympic swimmer
- 13 April – Dorothy Isaksen, New South Wales politician (d. 2023)
- 14 April – Kevin Humphreys, rugby league player (d. 2010)
- 20 April – Gordon Hamilton Fairley, surgeon and oncologist (d. 1975)
- 24 April – Ken Muggleston, set decorator (d. 2021)

=== May - June ===
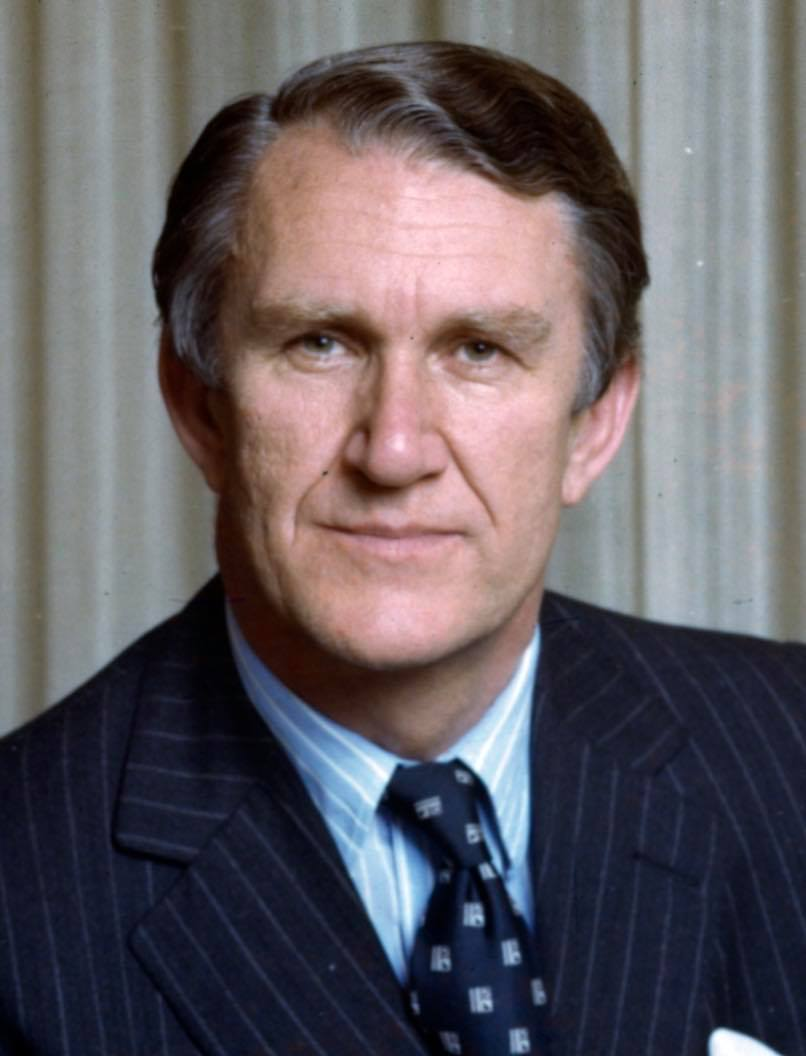
Malcolm Fraser

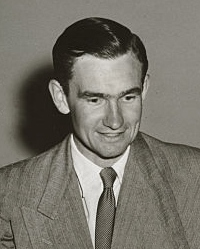
Jim Burke

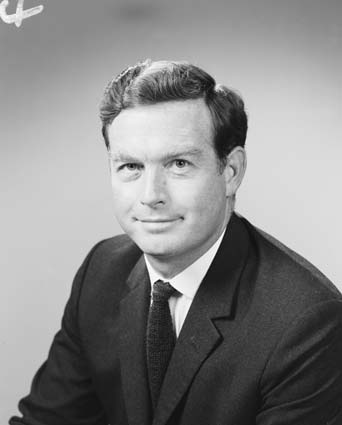
Dugald Munro

- 4 May – Colin Hughes, academic and public servant (born in The Bahamas) (d. 2017)
- 7 May – Tom McVeigh, Queensland politician
- 9 May – Bob Brown, motorcyclist (d. 1960)
- 15 May – Haddon Storey, Victorian politician
- 16 May – Brian Davies, rugby league footballer (d. 2012)
- 21 May
  - Malcolm Fraser, 22nd Prime Minister of Australia (d. 2015)
  - Syd Slocomb, Australian rules footballer (St Kilda) (d. 2021)
- 24 May
  - Tony Bull, Australian rules footballer (Melbourne) (d. 2019)
  - Barry Downs, Olympic sports shooter (d. 2020)
- 30 May – Sever Sternhell, academic, and organic chemist (born in Poland) (d. 2022)
- 9 June
  - Terry Norris, Victorian politician and actor (d. 2023)
  - David Wordsworth, Western Australian politician (born in India) (d. 2024)
- 11 June – Neale Lavis, Olympic equestrian (d. 2019)
- 12 June
  - Jim Burke, cricketer (d. 1979)
  - Dugald Munro, New South Wales politician (d. 1973)
- 14 June – Lorna Fejo, member of the stolen generations (d. 2022)
- 16 June – Malcolm Brooks, New South Wales politician (d. 2020)
- 18 June – Roger Johnston, Victorian politician (d. 2020)
- 25 June – Alf Hughes, Australian rules footballer (Hawthorn) (d. 2019)

=== July - August ===
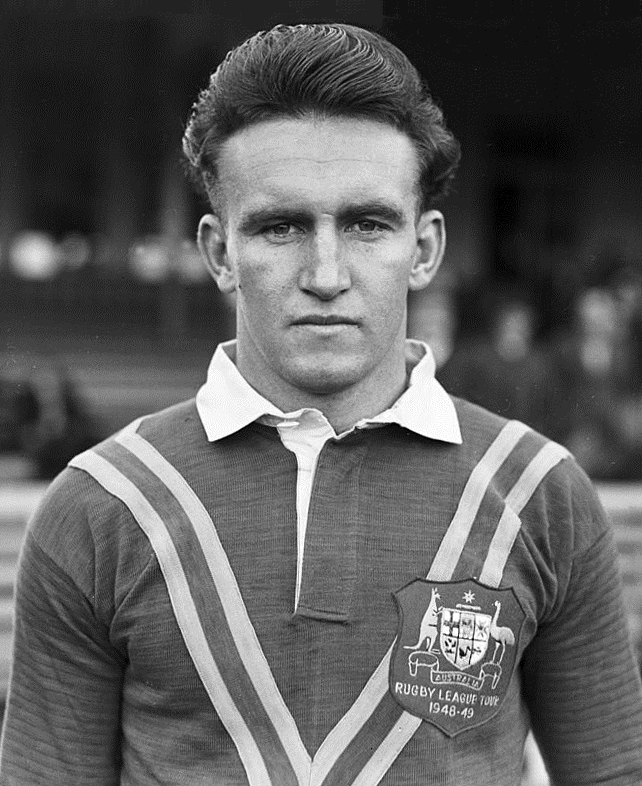
Bobby Dimond

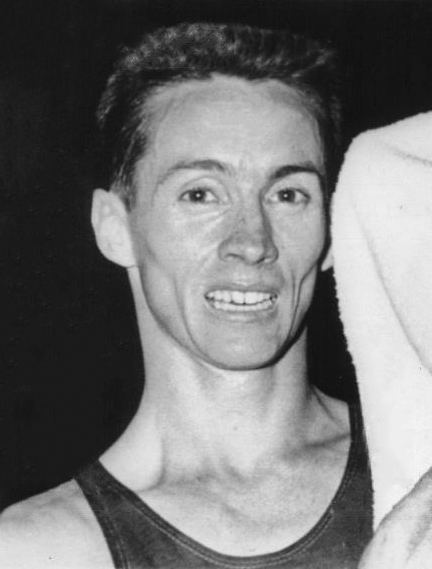
Al Lawrence

- 1 July – Jack Hedley, Australian rules footballer (North Melbourne) (d. 2021)
- 2 July – Ron Grey, senior army officer and commissioner of the Australian Federal Police (d. 2022)
- 6 July
  - Michael Baume, New South Wales politician
  - Tom Hynd, Queensland politician (d. 2011)
- 10 July
  - Harold Allison, South Australian politician (d. 2025)
  - John Green, botanist
- 14 July
  - Stan Evans, South Australian politician (d. 2025)
  - Ray Martini, Australian rules footballer
- 17 July – Sir William Heseltine, Private Secretary to Queen Elizabeth II
- 18 July – Judy Gamin, Queensland politician (d. 2022)
- 20 July – Bryan Conquest, Queensland politician (d. 2018)
- 26 July – Johno Johnson, New South Wales politician (d. 2017)
- 30 July
  - Bobby Dimond, rugby league footballer (d. 2020)
  - Al Lawrence, Olympic runner (d. 2017)
- 31 July – John Freebairn, South Australian politician (d. 2016)
- 2 August
  - Vali Myers, visionary artist, dancer, bohemian and muse (d. 2003)
  - Peter Lehmann, wine producer (d. 2013)
- 9 August – Geoffrey Chard, operatic baritone (d. 2026)
- 22 August – Brian Bannon, New South Wales politician (d. 2017)
- 24 August – Paul Mooney, rugby union player (d. 2006)

=== September - October ===
Richie Benaud

- 9 September
  - Francis Carroll, archbishop (d. 2024)
  - Lon Hatherell, rugby union player (d. 1986)
  - Jack Lihou, cricketer (d. 2021)
- 11 September – Clifford Grant, operatic singer (d. 2021)
- 22 September – Donald MacMillan, rugby union player (d. 1982)
- 29 September – Richard Bonynge, conductor and pianist
- 4 October – Keith Batchelor, Australian rules footballer (Collingwood and North Melbourne) (d. 2009)
- 6 October – Richie Benaud, cricketer and commentator (d. 2015)
- 11 October – Ian Foreman, Australian rules footballer (Footscray) (d. 2021)
- 22 October – Sir Frank Lowy, businessman (born in Czechoslovakia)
- 31 October – Bill Hewitt, Queensland politician (d. 2016)

=== November - December ===
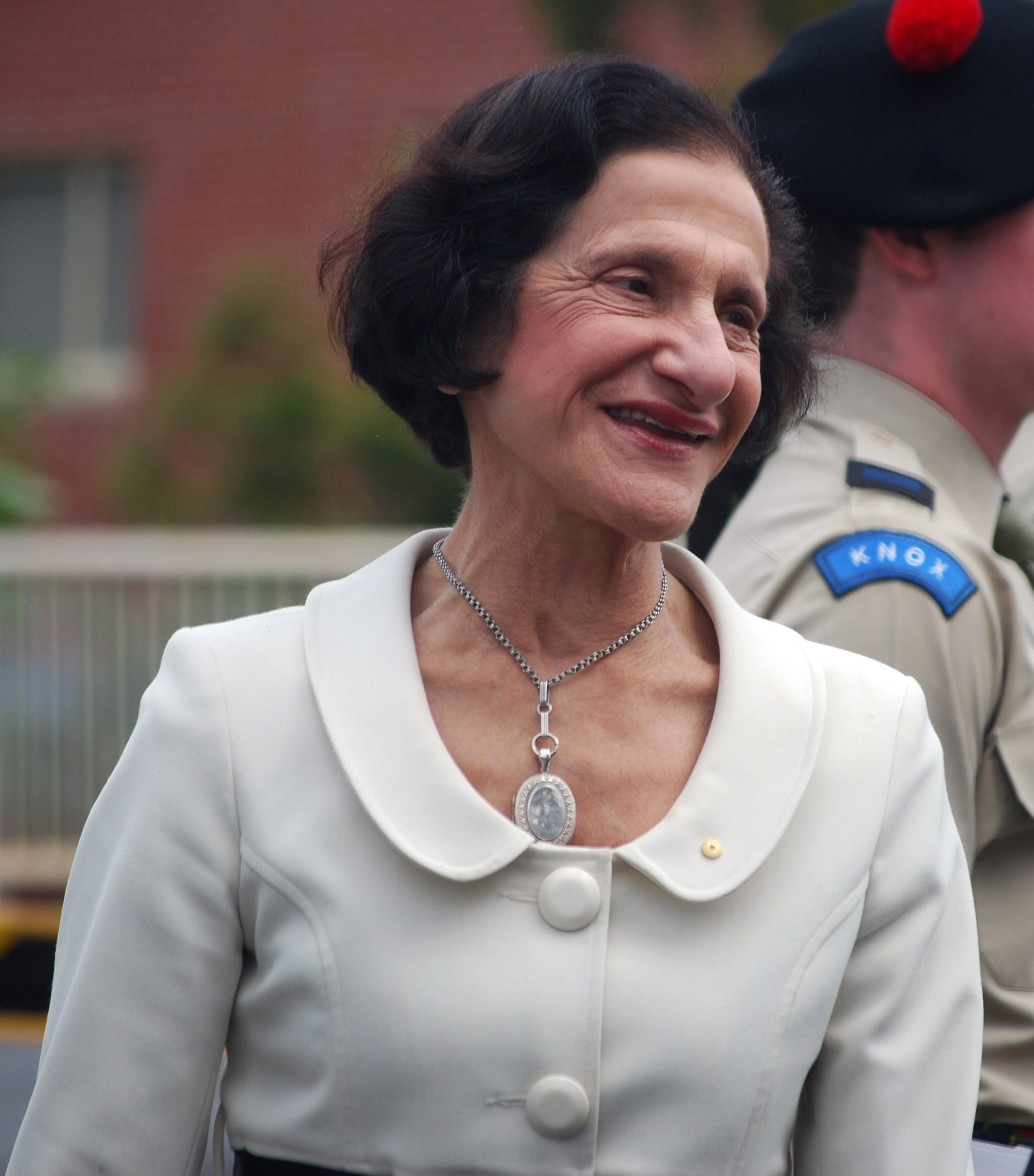
Marie Bashir

- 14 November – Ray Land, Olympic sprinter (d. 2020)
- 15 November – Ray Thorburn, New South Wales politician (d. 1986)
- 18 November – Geoff Williams, Australian rules footballer (Geelong) (d. 2020)
- 21 November – Eddie Stapleton, rugby union player (d. 2005)
- 27 November – Dick Poole, rugby league player (d. 2025)
- 28 November – Kate Baxter, fencer (d. 2019)
- 29 November – Max Evans, Western Australian politician (d. 2019)
- 30 November – John Newham, 16th Chief of the Air Staff (d. 2022)
- 1 December – Dame Marie Bashir, 37th Governor of New South Wales (d. 2026)
- 3 December
  - John Coulter, South Australian politician (d. 2024)
  - Daryl E. Hooper, electronic engineer (d. 1985)
- 4 December – Sir Donald Trescowthick, businessman (d. 2024)
- 5 December
  - Lionel Cox, Olympic track cyclist (d. 2010)
  - Brian Tobin, tennis player and executive (d. 2024)
- 8 December
  - June Craig, Western Australian politician
  - Doug Ricketson, rugby league player (d. 2019)
- 17 December – Dorothy Rowe, psychologist (d. 2019)
- 19 December – Richard Scotton, health economist (d. 2019)
- 20 December – Noel Ferrier, actor (d. 1997)
- 29 December – Lilliane Brady, Mayor of Cobar (d. 2021)
- 31 December – Phil O'Brien, Australian rules footballer (Hawthorn) (d. 2020)

== Deaths ==
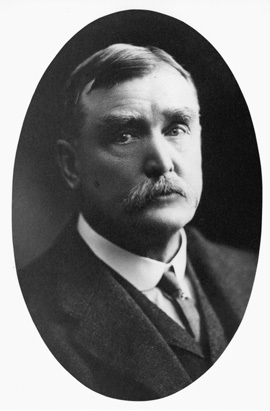
Sir Henry Lefroy

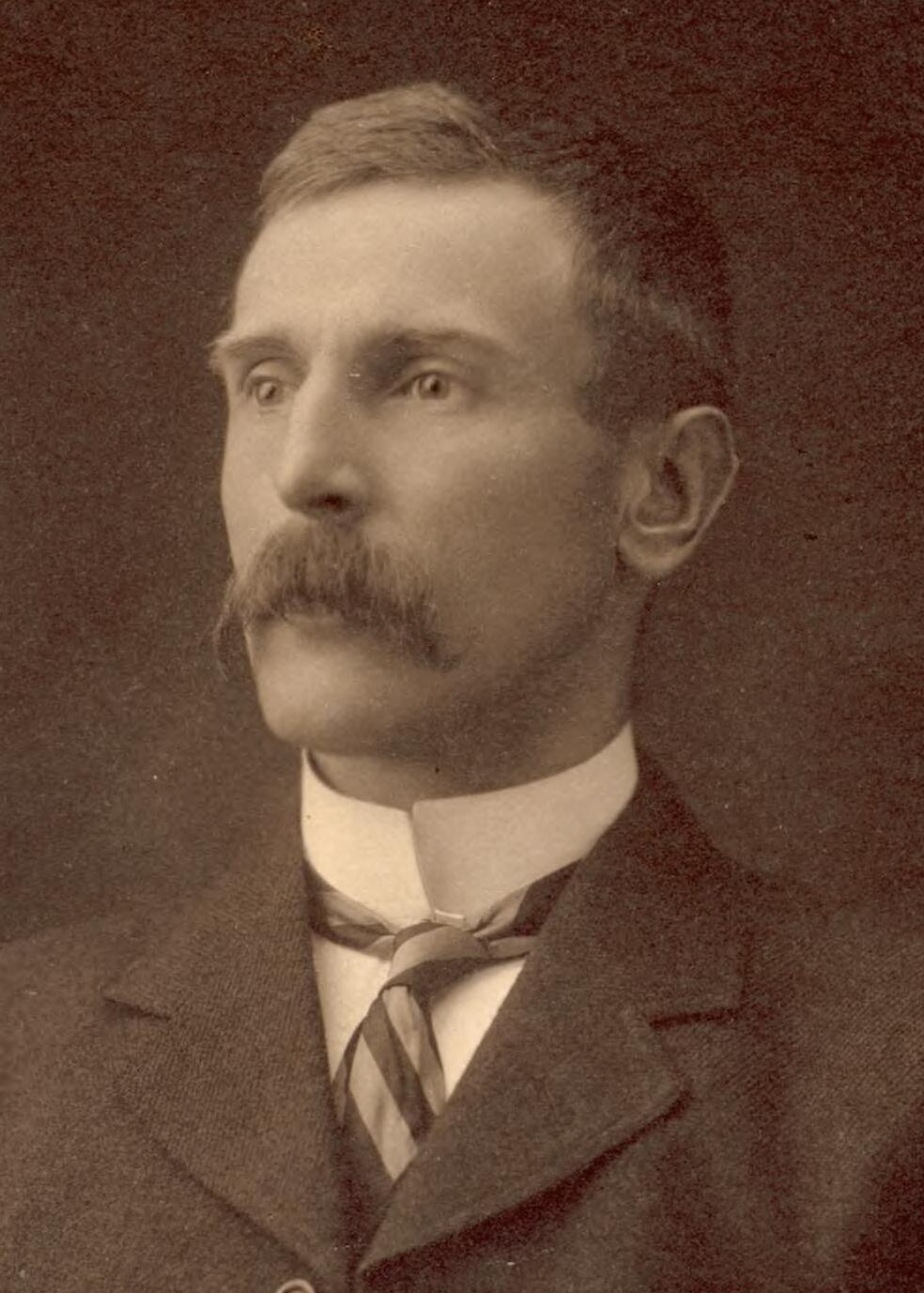
Sir James McCay

- 14 January – John Bisdee, military officer and Victoria Cross recipient (b. 1869)
- 18 January – Brailsford Robertson, physiologist and biochemist (born in the United Kingdom) (b. 1884)
- 3 March – Algernon Keith-Falconer, 9th Earl of Kintore, 12th Governor of South Australia (born and died in the United Kingdom) (d. 1852)
- 19 March – Sir Henry Lefroy, 11th Premier of Western Australia (b. 1854)
- 22 April – John Russell, impressionist painter (b. 1858)
- 21 May – Robert Cook, Victorian politician (b. 1867)
- 27 May – Jethro Brown, jurist and professor of law (b. 1868)
- 6 July – Margaret Francis Ellen Baskerville, sculptor, water colourist, and educator (b. 1861)
- 27 July – George James Coates, artist (died in the United Kingdom) (b. 1869)
- 20 August
  - Charles Bannerman, cricketer (born in the United Kingdom) (b. 1851)
  - John Brazier, malacologist (b. 1842)
- 2 September – Archibald Strong, scholar and poet (b. 1876)
- 11 September – William Carpenter, Western Australian politician (b. 1863)
- 19 September – Sir Neville Howse, New South Wales politician, military officer and first Australian recipient of the Victoria Cross (born and died in the United Kingdom) (b. 1863)
- 1 October
  - Albert Henry Fullwood, artist (born in the United Kingdom) (b. 1863)
  - Sir James McCay, Victorian politician and soldier (born in Ireland) (b. 1864)
- 30 October – John Creed, New South Wales politician and doctor (born in the United Kingdom) (b. 1842)
- 13 November – Thomas Bulch, musician and composer (born in the United Kingdom) (b. 1862)
- 14 November – Sandy Pearce, rugby league player (b. 1883)
- 16 December – Octavius Beale, piano manufacturer and philanthropist (born in Ireland) (b. 1850)

== See also ==
- List of Australian films of the 1930s
