= Donald McMillan =

Donald McMillan or MacMillan may refer to:

- Donald McMillan (Ontario politician) (1835–1914), senator from Ontario
- Donald McMillan (Quebec politician) (1807–1876), who represented Vaudreuil in the 1st Canadian Parliament
- Donald Baxter MacMillan (1874–1970), American explorer
- Ian MacMillan (rugby union) (Donald Ian MacMillan, 1930–1982), rugby union player who represented Australia
- Don MacMillan (1928–2004), Australian Olympic athlete
