= Tony Bull =

Tony Bull may refer to:

- Tony Bull (footballer) (1930–2019), Australian rules footballer
- Tony Bull (wrestler), British wrestler
