= Sid Barnes =

Australian cricketer (1916–1973)

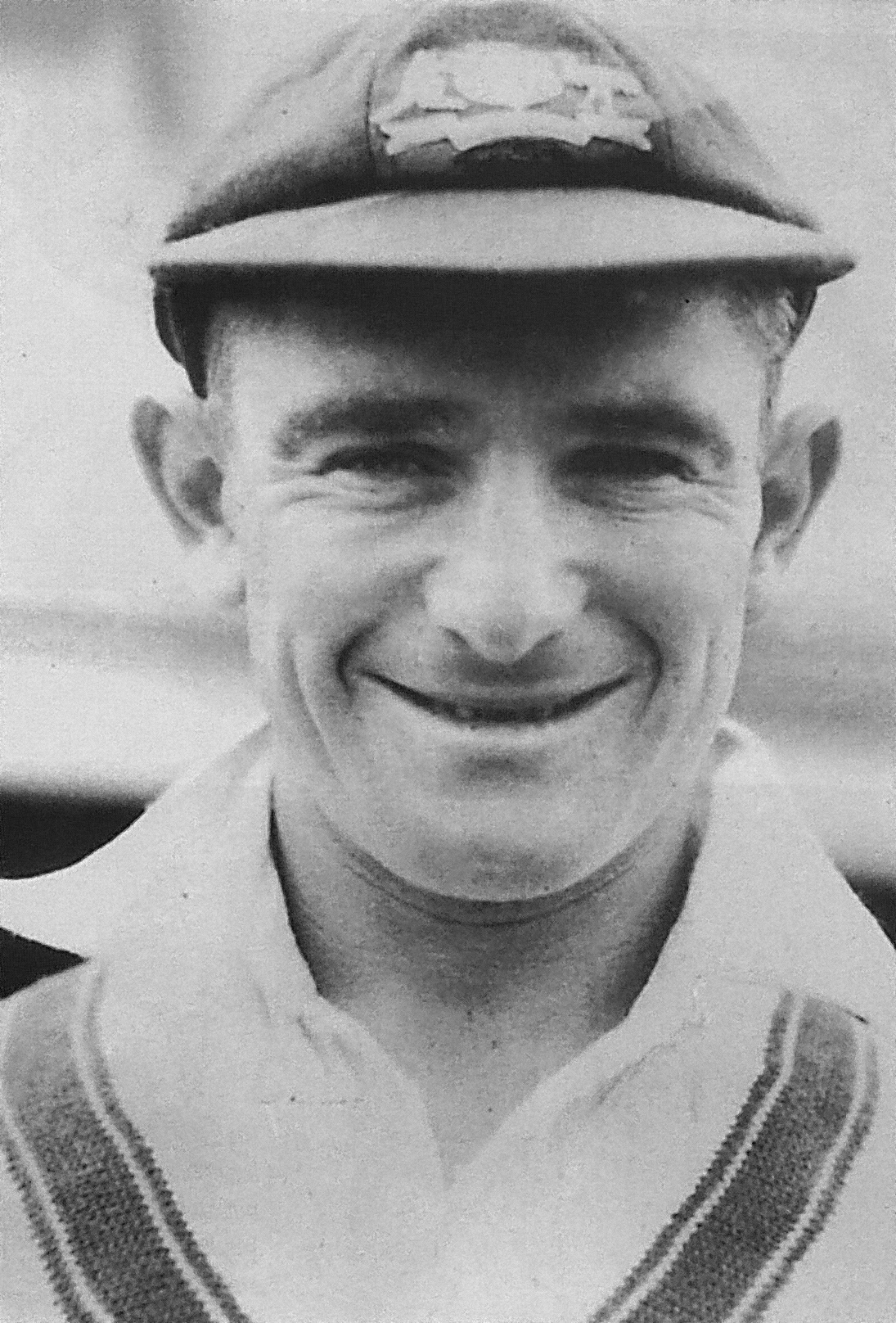
- Barnes in cricket whites

Personal information
- Full name: Sidney George Barnes
- Born: 5 June 1916; Annandale, New South Wales, Australia
- Died: 16 December 1973 (aged 57); Collaroy, New South Wales, Australia
- Nickname: Bagga
- Height: 173 cm (5 ft 8 in)
- Batting: Right-handed
- Bowling: Right-arm leg break
- Role: Batsman, occasional wicket-keeper

International information
- National side: Australia
- Test debut (cap 163): 20 August 1938 v England
- Last Test: 14 August 1948 v England

Domestic team information
- Years: Team
- 1936/37–1952/53: New South Wales

Career statistics
| Competition | Tests | First-class |
|---|---|---|
| Matches | 13 | 110 |
| Runs scored | 1,072 | 8,333 |
| Batting average | 63.05 | 54.11 |
| 100s/50s | 3/5 | 26/37 |
| Top score | 234 | 234 |
| Balls bowled | 564 | 4,451 |
| Wickets | 4 | 57 |
| Bowling average | 54.50 | 32.21 |
| 5 wickets in innings | 0 | 0 |
| 10 wickets in match | 0 | 0 |
| Best bowling | 2/25 | 3/0 |
| Catches/stumpings | 14/– | 80/4 |
- Source: CricketArchive, 28 November 2007

Sidney George Barnes (5 June 1916 – 16 December 1973) was an Australian cricketer and cricket writer, who played 13 Test matches between 1938 and 1948. Able to open the innings or bat down the order, Barnes was regarded as one of Australia's finest batsmen in the period immediately following World War II. He helped create an enduring record when scoring 234 in the second Test against England at Sydney in December 1946; exactly the same score as his captain, Don Bradman, in the process setting a world-record 405-run fifth wicket partnership. Barnes averaged 63.05 over 19 innings in a career that, like those of most of his contemporaries, was interrupted by World War II.

He made his first-class debut at the end of the 1936–37 season when selected for New South Wales, and he was later included in the team for the 1938 Australian tour of England, making his Test debut in the final international of the series. On the resumption of Test cricket after the war, he was picked as the opening partner to Arthur Morris. Barnes was a member of The Invincibles, the 1948 Australian team that toured England without losing a single match. Retiring from cricket at the end of that tour, Barnes attempted a comeback to Test cricket in the 1951–52 season that was ultimately and controversially unsuccessful.

Barnes had a reputation as an eccentric and was frequently the subject of controversy. This included a celebrated libel case, following his exclusion from the national team in 1951–52 for "reasons other than cricket ability". He was later involved in an incident where, acting as twelfth man, he performed his duties on the ground in a suit and tie (rather than 'whites'), carrying a bizarre range of superfluous items. Despite this reputation, Barnes was a shrewd businessman who used the opportunities afforded by cricket to supplement his income through trading, journalism and property development. Increasing paranoia brought about by bipolar disorder saw Barnes lose many of the friends he had made through the game as he sought treatment for his depression. On 16 December 1973, he was found dead at his home in the Sydney suburb of Collaroy; he had ingested barbiturates and bromide in a probable suicide.

== Early years ==
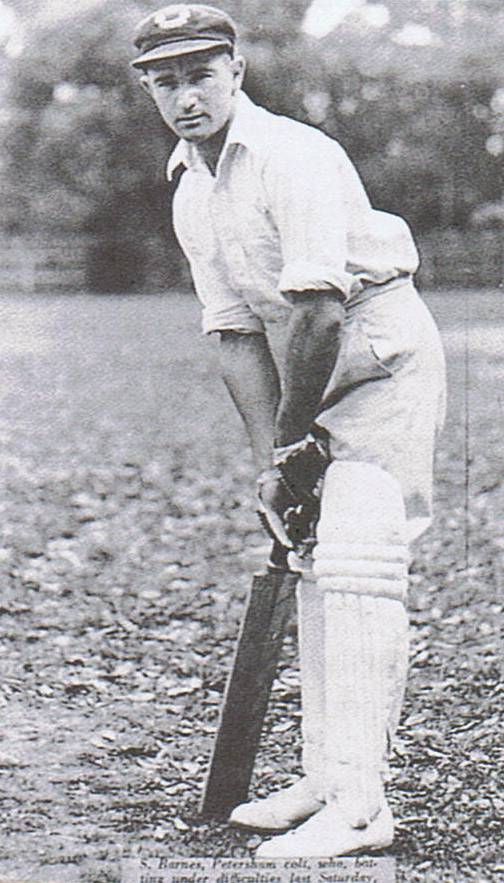
Barnes, aged 16, as a Petersham player

Barnes was born in 1916 in Annandale, an inner suburb of Sydney. However, in his autobiography, he claims to have been born in 1918 or 1919 in Queensland, and his military service record has his date of birth as 5 June 1917. He was the third child of Alfred Percival Barnes and Hilda May Barnes (née Jeffery), both from farming families near Tamworth in northern New South Wales. After marrying, the couple left Tamworth to take up a lease on a remote sheep station near Hughenden in North Queensland. Before Sid was born, Alfred died from typhoid fever, caused by drinking contaminated water on the family property. After his death, Hilda, widowed and pregnant with her latest child, moved to Sydney with her children and stayed with her sister, where Sid was born. From her husband's estate, Hilda Barnes mother was able to purchase and renovate real estate in Stanmore and Leichhardt, New South Wales, to let or sell. Later in life, Barnes would recount how, as a child, he used to collect the rents for his mother.

=== Childhood and club cricket ===
Barnes attended Stanmore Public School and, although not a scholar, was a keen participant in sporting activities. His introduction to cricket came via his older brother, Horrie; Horrie was a useful batsman who played in the local Western Suburbs Churches league and paid Sid sixpence to bowl to him after he finished work. Taking an interest in the game, Sid had trials for the school team and was eventually selected in the first XI. An early controversy saw Barnes suspended for three weeks for disputing an umpire's decision. Successes for both his school team and his local club team, St. Augustine, saw him acquire the nickname The Governor-General—the nickname of Australian Test player, Charlie Macartney, and he was selected for New South Wales Schoolboys to play teams from Victoria and Queensland.

In 1932–33, Barnes joined the Petersham club, and began playing in the third XI. Former Test batsman Tommy Andrews became his mentor at the club and in 1933–34, Barnes made his first-grade cricket debut as a batsman/wicket-keeper against Paddington, facing the bowling of Hunter Hendry and Alan McGilvray. He was soon successful, scoring a century against Manly in February. Even as a young and inexperienced cricketer, he showed a "brash confidence in his own ability." When praised for his batting by the great Test bowler Bill O'Reilly, Barnes responded "Thanks very much, you didn't bowl too badly yourself", leaving O'Reilly speechless.

This success led Barnes to consider cricket as a potential career. However, his mother and stepfather were concerned about the likelihood of cricket providing him with a living. In response, Barnes took a job with a garage in Mosman but after finding that the necessary travel interfered too much with playing cricket, he found alternative employment, demonstrating motorbikes in the city.

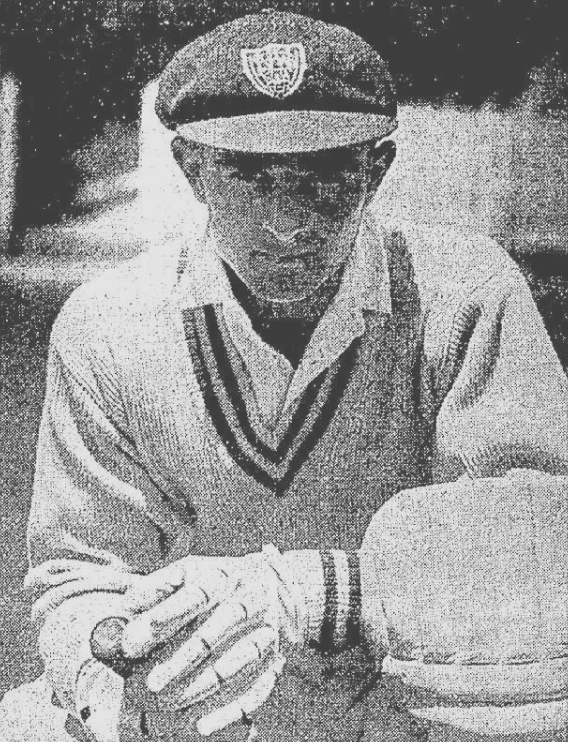
Barnes in NSW cap, 1937.

=== First-class cricket ===
Barnes had come to the attention of the New South Wales selectors by the 1936–37 season and was included as twelfth man in the side to play the visiting English side, taking a catch on the boundary to dismiss Stan Worthington. He made his first-class debut in the final Sheffield Shield match of the season, against South Australia at the Sydney Cricket Ground. Batting at number five, Barnes scored 31 and 44, twice being dismissed LBW by the leg spinner Frank Ward. Whilst fielding, Barnes managed to find himself in controversy again, running out Vic Richardson, the opposition captain, after the end of the over was called. The square leg umpire had not heard the call of "Over" and upheld the appeal, much to the disgust of Richardson. The New South Wales captain Stan McCabe, whom Barnes idolized, withdrew the appeal.

Barnes was selected for New South Wales for the opening match of the 1937–38 season against Queensland making 68 in a rain-affected match. Against the touring New Zealanders, Barnes fell just short of his maiden first-class century, scoring 97. He appeared to have reached the landmark when scoring 127 not out against Western Australia, but the New South Wales Cricket Association retrospectively deemed the match to be not of first-class status, angering Barnes. He finally scored his maiden first-class century (110) against Victoria in the final game of the season, completing his hundred while bleeding profusely after being struck on the jaw by a ball delivered by Ernie McCormick. As a result of his performances over the season (scoring over 800 runs, averaging 50.56), Barnes was selected as the youngest member of the Australian cricket team to tour England in 1938.

== Test cricket ==
=== Pre-war debut ===
Unfortunately for Barnes, he broke his wrist while exercising on the sea voyage to England for the 1938 tour, keeping the injury secret until the tourists had departed Gibraltar, for fear of being sent home. On arrival in England, he therefore did not play an innings until the last day of June, missing exactly half of the 30 first-class matches scheduled for the tour, including the first two Tests, both of which were drawn. His first innings was 42 against Derbyshire and he shared in a fourth wicket stand of 176 with Bill Brown, who made an unbeaten 265. The third Test was a wash-out and he was not picked for the fourth, which the Australians won, although in his autobiography he claimed that he was considered as a candidate to be wicketkeeper, having deputised for Ben Barnett in that role in tour matches against Warwickshire and Nottinghamshire. In the event, his Test debut came in the final Test, played at The Oval. Barnes had to field for 16 hours as England amassed a total of 903 for seven declared, then the highest Test score. Barnes bowled 38 overs in the innings and took the seventh wicket, that of Arthur Wood, for 84 runs. With both Don Bradman and Jack Fingleton injured and unable to bat, Australia struggled – England won by an innings and 579 runs – still the largest winning margin in Test cricket history; but Barnes played innings of 41 and 33 and, according to Wisden, "well justified his choice". In all first-class matches on the tour, Barnes scored 720 runs, and reached 90 three times, though without going on to a first-class century. He scored 140 in a two-day match against Durham, which was not considered first-class.

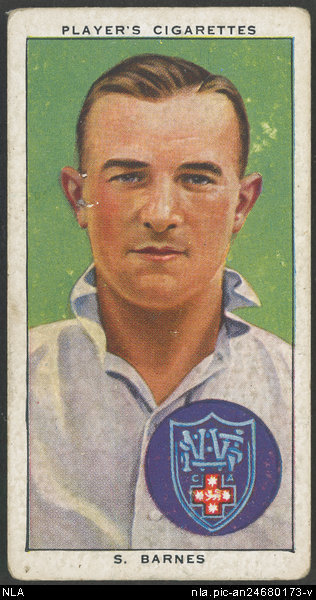
Cigarette card showing Barnes as a New South Wales representative

His international career was then put on hold, as all foreign tours were suspended during World War II. He continued to play first-class cricket in Australia, before enlisting in the Second Australian Imperial Force in May 1942. Barnes's time in the military was short. A man who was proud of his appearance, he had a uniform made to measure when the one issued did not fit. He met champion golfer Norman Von Nida early into his enlistment and the two were assigned to the 1st Armoured Division in Greta. A shortage of tanks and the military regimen led to boredom and Barnes used his hitherto ignored trade background to his advantage, seeking a release to join a tank-making company, which was granted. Von Nida and Barnes remained friends and business partners for many years afterwards.

=== Post-war series ===
After scoring 1,050 runs (including six centuries) at an average of 75.00 in the 1940–41 season, Barnes played little cricket until 1945–46, when he scored centuries in five successive matches for New South Wales. He was picked for the 1945–46 Australian tour of New Zealand and played in the representative match that was later designated as the first Test match between the two countries: he made 54 as Australia won easily. The post-war period also saw a new approach to batting on the part of Barnes. He discarded his aggressive and flamboyant shot-making and re-invented himself as a watchful, more defensive player, which made his scoring more prolific, although less crowd pleasing.

Barnes was made captain of New South Wales for the 1946–47 Australian season, though he only managed to play three matches for the state team. One of those was the match against the touring MCC team, and Barnes was approached during the match about becoming an opening batsman for the forthcoming Test series. He wrote in his autobiography: "I had never opened before and was a little dubious. I had, however, struck new balls at different periods of innings and was not afraid of that." He also liked the idea of batting ahead of Bradman in the batting order: "Much better, I thought, to get in before him than to come later, like flat beer after champagne."

Barnes was first-choice as an opener with Arthur Morris throughout the Test series, although it was not until the Third Test that they had a first-wicket partnership of any substance. Morris had broken into the team as an opener after an injury sidelined Bill Brown for the entire season.

The First Test at Brisbane was dominated by Australia, a pattern that was to be a feature of the series, although Barnes contributed only 31 to the total of 645 which brought an innings victory. Barnes displayed his liking for slightly aggressive practical jokes in this match: during a break for a particularly ferocious thunderstorm, he

got a huge block of ice out of the tub in which our drinks were kept, staggered to the side of the dressing-room and tossed it on to the roof over the English dressing-room. It caused a noise for a start that brought all the Englishmen running and then it came over the side of the gutter, crashed on to the lawn and slithered down the grass. Those English eyes certainly did stand out.

Bradman had words with Barnes after this match about his new role as an opener. Barnes later wrote:

He asked me how I liked it. I said it suited me. 'You batted very well in this game,' he said, 'but not quite as an opener. You were looking for runs all the time. I think what you want to watch as an opener is not getting out ... What is needed from my openers, and is most important, is patience and plenty of it.' I was completely willing to be guided by anything that Bradman wanted me to do.

Years later, Barnes wrote about the effect this had on his batting style.

There was one angle about this change of batting position that didn't appeal to me. I am, by nature, a forcing batsman. I like to take the shine out of a bowler [sic] and I love to hear the ball rattling the pickets, or soaring over the fence ... My footwork was quick and I often caused delight by stepping back feet outside the leg stump and square-cutting ... If I were to become an Australian Test opening batsman I would have to conform to standard. I would have to put up the shutters ... And so I came to the Second Test in Sydney ready to drape myself in the gloomy colors of a Test opening batsman.

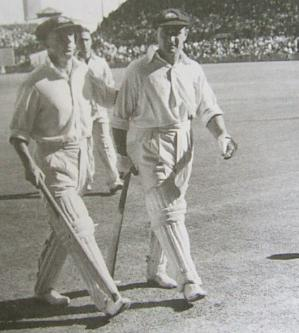
Bradman and Barnes leave the field for an adjournment as both head towards 234.

It was during the Second Test at Sydney in December 1946, that Barnes made a lasting impression on the world game. Having opened the innings, he made his top Test score of 234 and helped to set a world-record 405 run fifth-wicket partnership with Don Bradman, a record that still stands today. On a rain-affected pitch Arthur Morris was out at 1/24 and Ian Johnson came out as a nightwatchman He and Barnes angered the crowd by launching into a series of bad light appeals – up to 12 were counted – before the umpires gave way and play was ended with an hour to spare. This ensured that Australia would not have to play on a sticky wicket and allowed Bradman to rest his leg until play resumed on the Monday. After the series Barnes said on radio:

We could have played on, but it was a Test match and we just had to win. I realised something drastic had to be done or three wickets might be lost. So I appealed after every second ball. I complained of the people moving about, the light, and, in fact, anything, in an effort to get the appeal upheld. Hammond and Yardley were inspecting the wet pitch. I knew there was a chance of losing valuable wickets so I just kept on appealing until the umpires answered me.

Barnes played carefully on the still-suspect pitch the following day, and, late in the afternoon, Bradman, lower in the order than usual due to a leg injury, joined Barnes with the score at 4/159. Over six and a half hours later, Bradman was out for 234. Barnes was dismissed just four balls later, also for 234, having batted for over ten hours. In his autobiography, Barnes stated that the coincidence of scores was intended. "Lots of people have asked me whether I deliberately threw my wicket away at 234. The answer is yes." He confirmed to an interviewer many years later that "it wouldn't be right for someone to make more runs than Sir Donald Bradman". E.W. Swanton wrote that this "could well have been so for he was a man of quixotic mood and temperament". However the England bowler, Alec Bedser wrote "It was when I was bowling to Sid at Sydney that I first discovered that I could move the ball to leg by use of my wrist and fingers...I held the ball in the same manner as a leg-break bowler with the fingers across the seam...and on pitching I was surprised to see the ball go away like a leg-break. It also surprised Sid Barnes". This would make Barnes the first batsman to be dismissed by Bedser's "Special Ball" which would claim Bradman for a duck in the Fourth Test at Adelaide.

Barnes injured his hand during fielding practice before the Third Test, and although he went on to play in that game (scoring 45 and 32), he opted out of batting in a state game – according to his autobiography, this cost him the New South Wales captaincy – and he missed the fourth Test. He returned for the final Test and top-scored with 71 in Australia's first innings, adding 30 in the second.

Barnes went to England in 1947. In his autobiography, he claimed that he went as a representative for a wine and spirits company, although after the initial mention of that there is no further word and he appears also to have dealt in commodities that were in short supply because of rationing in England. Once in England, he was approached by Burnley to play as a professional in Lancashire League cricket, which he did for a while before finding it "too much of a drag" and resigning.

Barnes returned to Australia for the 1947–48 season, keen to win a place on the 1948 tour to England. He was worried that having played as a professional in the Lancashire League would damage his chance of further Test cricket, but at the same time suggested that he had offers from other Lancashire League teams to fall back on should he not be picked. There was also concern that, with his wife now living in Scotland, he would breach the Australian rule that wives were not allowed to travel with Test cricketers. In fact, lack of form and opportunity were greater threats to Barnes's continued Test career. Arriving back with several state games having already been played, he failed to make runs for New South Wales and was not picked for the first two Tests against the Indian tourists, Bill Brown taking over as opener with Morris.

The match between Victoria and New South Wales was Barnes's chance to redeem himself. Wisden reported it thus:

Barnes needed a score to rehabilitate himself in the eyes of the Test Selectors and he spent all Saturday over 131 runs while 20,000 impatient spectators barracked loudly. His dismissal on the third day evoked cheers all round the ground.

He followed that century (158 in total) with a similarly plodding 80 not out in the second innings, and was picked for the third Test, with Brown dropped after a series of low scores in the first two Tests. Barnes made only 12 and 15, jeopardising his place, but what Wisden termed "another of his dour, determined but faultless innings for top score" in the New South Wales game against South Australia ensured a second chance. In the fourth Test at Adelaide he made 112 and put on 236 with Bradman for the second wicket. With 33 in the final match of the series, his place on the 1948 tour was secure, though he had to give assurances about the amount of contact he would have with his wife, still living in Scotland, before he was confirmed.

=== The Invincibles tour ===
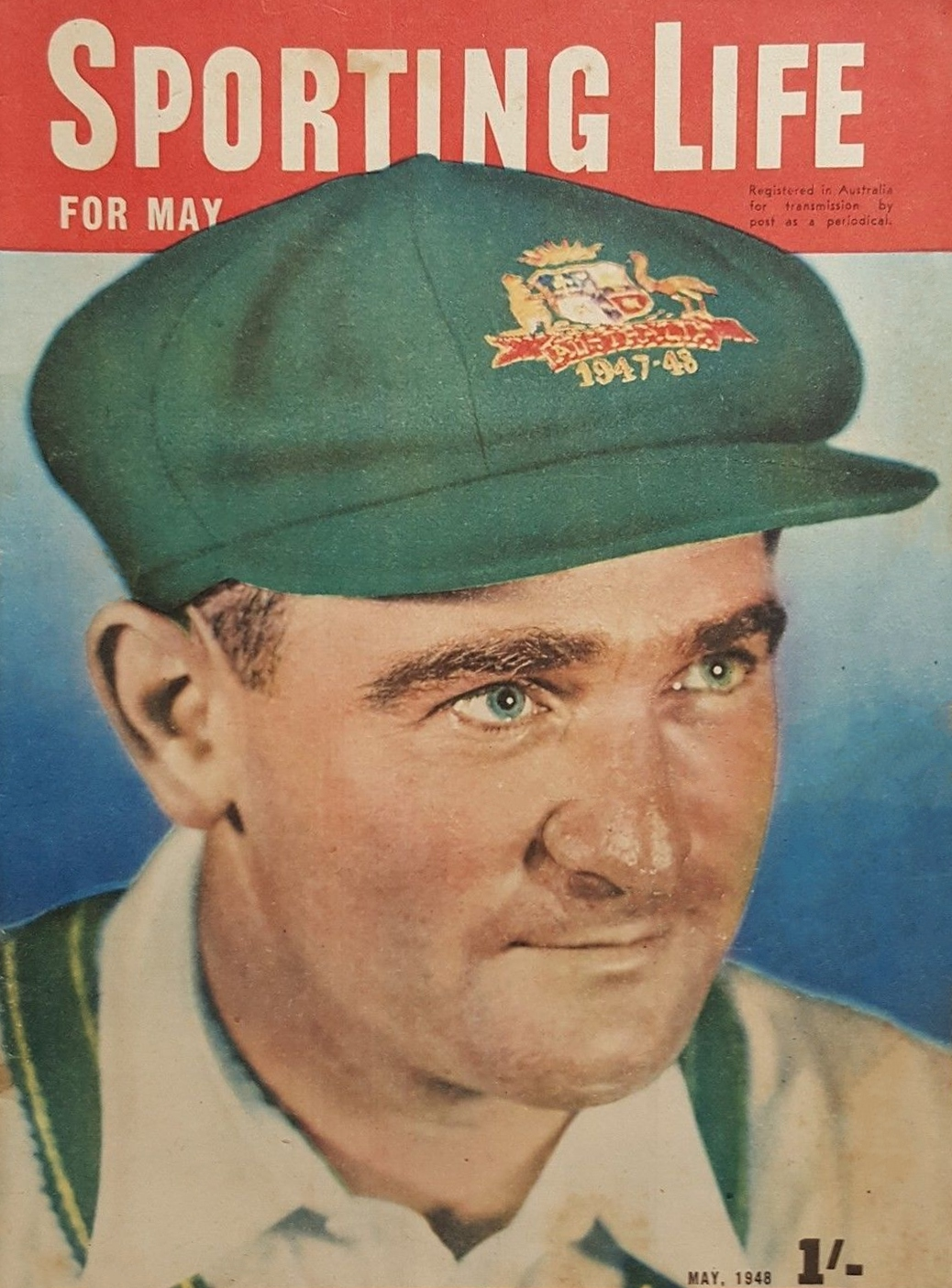
Barnes on the cover of Sporting Life, 1948.

The 1948 Australia team that toured England has become known as The Invincibles, because they did not lose a single game. Following their performances during the Australian season, Barnes and Morris were favoured as Australia's first-choice opening pair, while Brown batted out of position in the middle order in the first two Tests.

Before the second Test at Lord's, Barnes wagered £8 at 15/1 on himself to score a century. He made a duck in the first innings but ensured success in the second, making 141.

Barnes and Morris shared century opening partnerships at Lord's and The Oval, where their 117 run stand dwarfed the 52 all out made by the entire England team. In addition to his century at Lord's, Barnes made three other scores over 60 in the series.

When fielding, Barnes stationed himself as close to the bat as possible at either forward short-leg or point. The report of the tour in the 1949 edition of Wisden Cricketers' Almanack, stated that Barnes's fielding was as important a factor as his batting in The Invincibles' success:

Probably a number of batsmen were sufficiently affected by his close attendance to cause them to lose concentration on the bowler running up, but equally important was that the knowledge of his presence influenced opponents to avoid strokes in that direction. The Barnes demeanour in the field illustrated the general purposefulness of the Australians.

However, he received criticism for this approach and it resulted in him missing the fourth Test at Headingley through injury. In England's first innings of the third Test, he was hit in the ribs by a full-blooded pull shot from Dick Pollard from the bowling of Ian Johnson, and had to be carried from the pitch by four policemen. The following day, he collapsed while practising in the nets, and when he went in to bat at number six, he collapsed again and had to retire hurt. After this, he was taken to hospital where he spent 10 days before rejoining the tour for the Derbyshire match that followed the fourth Test.

Barnes thus played in four of the five Tests, missing the fourth Test through injury. He scored 329 runs, averaging 82.25. During the first-class tour matches, Barnes's performance was less spectacular. In all first-class matches on the tour, he amassed 1354 runs, averaging 56.41. Barnes made 176 in 255 minutes against Surrey early in the tour, but, apart from his Test hundred, his only other century came in the final tour match, when the final 50 runs of his 151 against the H. D. G. Leveson-Gower XI at the Scarborough cricket festival came in just 25 minutes.

== Later playing career ==
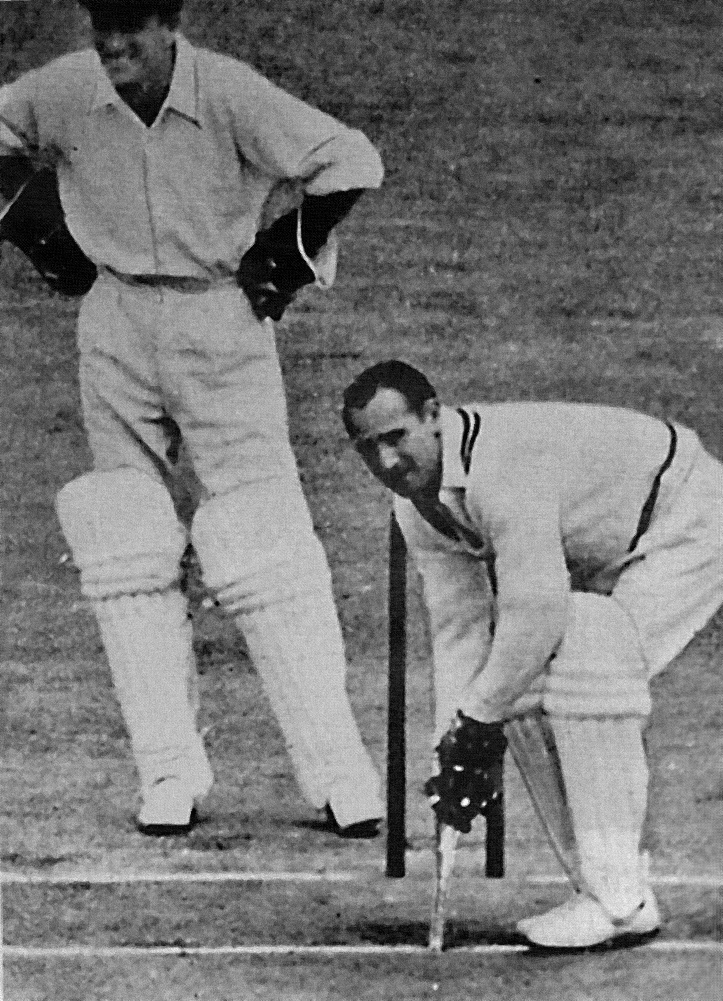
Barnes plays a practical joke by using a miniature bat in Bradman's testimonial match.

An important concern for Barnes, when returning from the United Kingdom to Australia, was to avoid paying customs duties on the enormous amount of goods he acquired through various deals during the tour. This included good quality English cloth, in very short supply in Australia at this time. Hearing a rumour that Customs officials were waiting in Sydney for him, Barnes disembarked at Melbourne and travelled to Sydney by train. The move worked and he sold his stock at a substantial profit, conservatively estimated to be equal to his tour fee.

Barnes played in Bradman's testimonial match at the MCG in December 1948, but otherwise made himself unavailable for first-class cricket, preferring to pursue business interests. He wrote a regular column for Sydney's The Daily Telegraph, prosaically titled "Like It or Lump It", in which he often criticised the administration of the game and the amounts paid to Australia's leading cricketers. Barnes was one of a number of cricket writers of the immediate post-war era who adopted a confrontational tabloid style of journalism, in contrast to the more sedate reporting of the 1930s.

=== Libel case ===
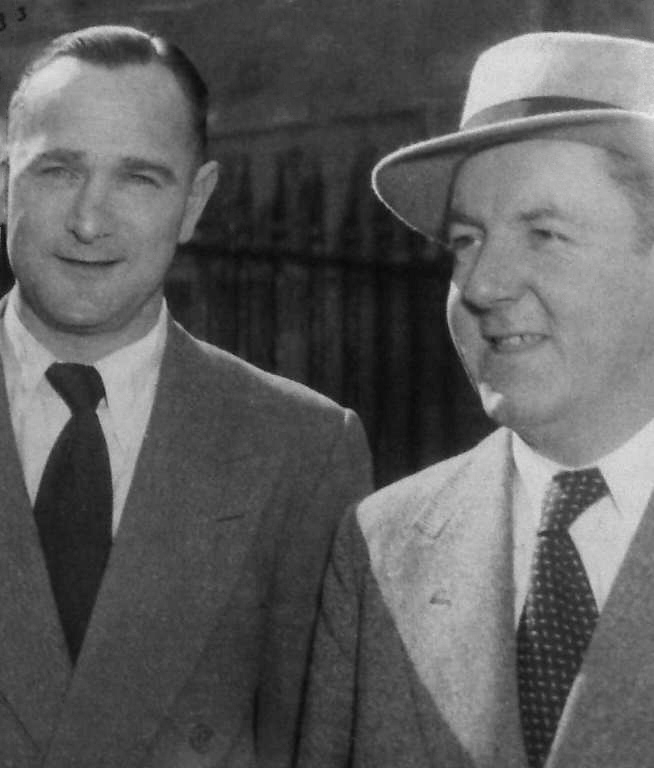
Barnes and his legal representative outside the venue of their libel case

At the beginning of the 1951–52 season, Barnes had a change of heart and returned to the New South Wales team in a bid to play Test cricket again. He approached Aubrey Oxlade, the chairman of Australian cricket's Board of Control, to ask if there was any impediment to his return to the Australian team. Oxlade told Barnes that he would be judged solely on his batting performances.

During his absence from the Test team, the Australian selectors had been unsuccessful in their attempts to find a reliable partner for Arthur Morris to open the batting. Barnes started the season solidly and, in the last match before the team for the third Test against the West Indies was chosen, he hit 107 against Victoria. The selectors duly picked him for the match, then passed the team list to the Board of Control for ratification. The Board vetoed the inclusion of Barnes and requested the nomination of a replacement player. Unwilling to accept the blame for Barnes's omission, the selectors deliberately deferred their decision on the replacement. When the team was not announced at the scheduled time, journalists uncovered the story and Barnes became a cause célèbre for many weeks, missing all of the remaining Tests. Speculation abounded as to the nature of his supposed misdeeds. These included jumping the turnstile at a ground when he forgot his player's pass; insulting the Royal Family; theft from team-mates; drunkenness; and stealing a car.

The Board of Control had granted themselves the power to exclude a player from the national team "on grounds other than cricket ability" following the poor behaviour of some members of the 1912 team that toured England. They had a secret dossier, compiled during the season, documenting Barnes's behaviour and they doctored the minutes of the meeting at which they discussed his selection. Publicly, the Board remained silent on their policy and how it related to Barnes. On the field, Barnes responded with an innings of 128 in three hours against Queensland; off the field, he sought answers from the administrators, but was frustrated by their evasiveness. His form tapered off during the closing stages of the season and he finished with 433 first-class runs at an average of 39.36.

Just as the furore appeared to have died down, in April 1952 Sydney's Daily Mirror published a letter from a reader, Jacob Raith. Responding to a letter in support of Barnes, Raith sided with the Board and suggested that his character was to blame for the omission. Acting on legal advice, Barnes sued Raith for libel and engaged Sydney's leading barrister, Jack Shand KC, as counsel.

The case began in Sydney's District Court on 21 August 1952. Shand's examination of the various Board members appearing for the defendant revealed the Board's maladministration, pettiness and its acceptance of rumour as fact. No firm reason was put forward for the omission of Barnes and a division within the Board was evident when several of its members spoke highly of him. As Barnes began his testimony on the second day of proceedings, Raith's counsel announced settlement of the case and commented to the court, "seldom in the history of libel actions has such a plea failed so completely and utterly". Barnes was vindicated with a full public apology.

Although the court case portrayed "an awful image of the chaos and bigotry under which Australian cricket was administered", it did little to alter the Board's culture. The next major court case involving Australian cricket, the World Series Cricket challenges of 1977–78 demonstrated that the Board was still run as a "closed shop", over 25 years later. In an analysis of the Barnes libel case, Gideon Haigh wrote, "far from becoming a watershed in player-administrator relations, it may even have discouraged players contemplating defiance of the Board but lacking the wherewithal to retain a hotshot criminal barrister."

=== Twelfth man incident ===
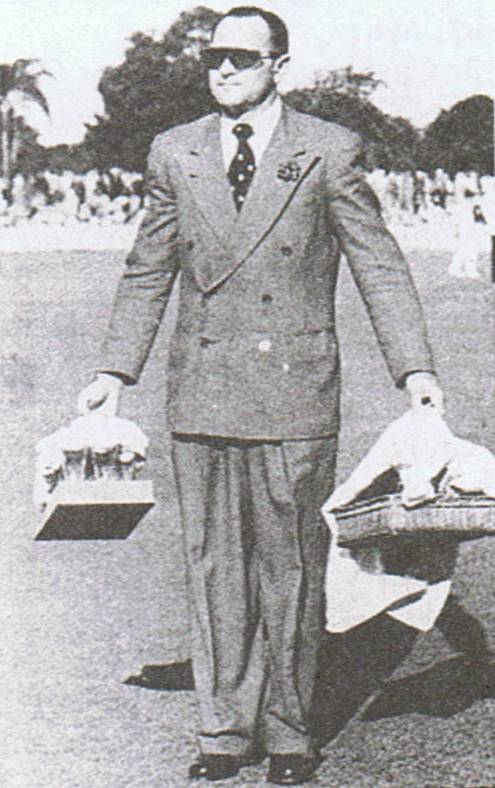
Barnes as twelfth man, dressed in suit and tie and carrying cigars, iced towels, a mirror and comb, a radio and a clothes brush

Resuming for New South Wales in 1952–53, Barnes scored 152 against Victoria in the last match before the beginning of the Test series against South Africa. Nevertheless, the selectors overlooked him for the first Test and in the following state match, against South Australia at the Adelaide Oval, Barnes offered to act as twelfth man to provide an opportunity for a younger player, Ray Flockton. During a drinks break on the second day of the match, he appeared on the ground in a suit and tie, (rather than 'whites') carrying superfluous items such as cigars, iced towels, a mirror and comb, a radio and a clothes brush. The crowd initially responded well to the joke, but their mood soured when the interval extended beyond its scheduled time and Barnes received criticism for delaying the game. The South Australian team, captained by future Australian selector Phil Ridings, officially complained to the New South Wales Cricket Association (NSWCA), which asked Barnes to express regret over the incident. Despite the association's support for Barnes during his problems of the previous season, he prevaricated. Eventually, the NSWCA forwarded a written apology on his behalf.

Barnes appeared just once more for New South Wales, against South Africa at New Year 1953, then made himself unavailable for selection, conceding that "his card had been marked". The Australian team toured England in 1953 and lost the Ashes after holding them for 19 years. Barnes wrote Eyes on the Ashes, a book about the tour that included trenchant criticism of the behaviour of the Australian team, which did not go down well with some of his former team-mates.

== Style and personality ==
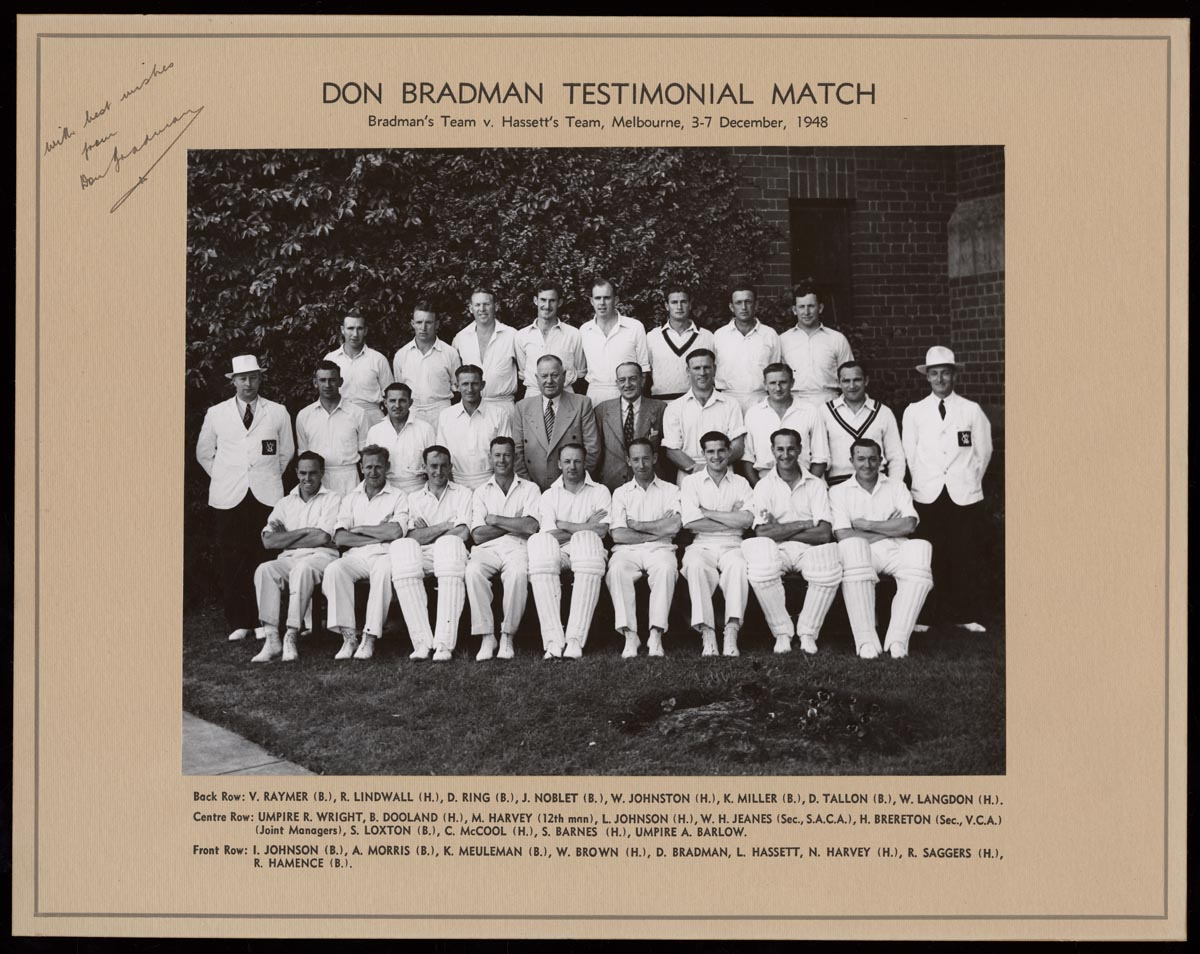
Barnes played in Don Bradman's Testimonial Match

Barnes gripped the bat very low on the handle and bent over so far in his stance that the knuckles of his right hand were level with his knees. He stood with his heels almost together and the toes of his left foot pointing toward extra cover, which left him open-chested when facing the bowler. A noticeable flourish in his backlift enabled him to follow the swinging delivery and play it late if necessary. His first movement was back and across the crease to cover the stumps from the view of the bowler, putting him in position to play the hook, leg glance, sweep and his favourite square cut shot.

Journalist Ray Robinson called Barnes the Artful Dodger of cricket, alluding to both his batting style and his off-field business dealings, and wrote that he "would rather steal a run like a pickpocket than hit an honest four with a straightforward stroke." Robinson summarised his safety-first approach in going so far back as the bowler delivered:

Though this routine made his play air-tight in one way, it simplified opposing captains' field-placing to curb his scoring, it left him with a back-foot addict's liability to go leg-before-wicket or be caught behind on either side, and it allowed his attackers to bowl their most awkward length ... he could have made more runs since the war as a stroke-player, and won popular backing as a candidate for the title of world's best batsman, instead of the austere distinction of looking the hardest Australian to get out.

David Frith wrote of Bill Brown's memories of Barnes as a person, and his controversial fielding:

'Bagga' Barnes was also Bill's room-mate, and his affection for his late lamented pal, a lovable rogue, was obvious. He recalled the furore over Barnes's provocative field positioning, extremely close at silly mid-on, and how criticism of his foot being too close to the mown pitch prompted him to plonk his boot a couple of feet into the forbidden territory – and a couple of feet more when the English crowd roared at him.

He was a part-time leg break bowler, taking 57 wickets in first-class cricket at a useful average of 32.21. Barnes's leg break spun very little, but he had a topspinner which hurried onto the batsman and yielded him many wickets. Barnes was also a substitute wicket-keeper and a versatile fieldsman. During his career, he was noted for his disaffection for cricket administrators and umpires. On the 1948 tour of England, after an Australian appeal was turned down by umpire Alec Skelding, he grabbed a stray dog and presented it to Skelding, stating: "Now all you want is a white stick". A complex character, Barnes, "rarely forgave a slight or forgot a good turn. Stocky, with blue eyes and powerful wrists, he had a passion for physical fitness, and was an enthusiastic big-game fisherman and golfer".

== Life outside cricket ==
Barnes in later life

Barnes married a school teacher, Alison Margaret Edward, on 11 June 1942. Alison was the daughter of Kenneth Edward, a Scottish Professor of Theology at the University of Sydney. The couple met at a country dance, when Barnes, on his way back from an exhibition match in Katoomba, was bet the price of the meal that he could not get the young girl to dance with him. Within twelve months the pair were married.

Outside of cricket, Barnes followed his mother into property development (see above) and at various times entered into partnerships with Keith Miller and Norman Von Nida. His suspicious nature, which grew as time passed, saw these partnerships and developments end in arguments and recriminations. While Barnes was not a millionaire, he was a successful and organised businessman.

As a writer, Barnes had no claims to literary talent; his copy was ghost-written, in all likelihood by his friend Jack Tier and later by former professional rugby league footballer Peter Peters. His writing was of a provocative tone; his column in the Daily Express during the 1953 tour was called "The Aussie They Couldn't Gag". His forthright opinions certainly cost him friends and hardened the opinions of others about him. At the end of the 1953 tour, he published Eyes on the Ashes, and his autobiography, It Isn't Cricket. He also wrote The Ashes Ablaze in 1955, and turned to full-time writing, mostly for Sydney's The Daily Telegraph. His columns were perceived as being deliberately controversial, and, as time went by, increasingly regarded as carping.

In later life, Barnes suffered from depressive illness. He was diagnosed with bipolar disorder and treated with a combination of medication, mainly diazepam, and electroconvulsive therapy. He spent much of his last years in and out of clinics seeking treatment for his condition. In 1973, Barnes died at his home in Collaroy, one of Sydney's northern beach suburbs, from barbiturate and bromide poisoning. Although the medications were certainly self-administered, the coroner could not "determine intent".

== Statistical analysis ==
Highest Test Batting Averages
| Don Bradman (AUS) | 99.94 |
| Stewie Dempster (NZ) | 65.72 |
| Sid Barnes (AUS) | 63.05 |
| Taslim Arif (PAK) | 62.62 |
| Adam Voges (AUS) | 61.87 |
| Graeme Pollock (SAF) | 60.97 |
| George Headley (WI) | 60.83 |
| Herbert Sutcliffe (ENG) | 60.73 |
Source: ESPNcricinfo; Qualification: 10 completed innings, career completed.

Only six players with ten or more completed innings have achieved an end-of-career average in excess of 60. Barnes's 63.05 in 19 innings ranks him as number three in the history of Test cricket, behind Sir Donald Bradman (99.94, 80 innings) and Stewie Dempster (65.72, 15 innings).

Barnes's short career was dominated by his monumental double hundred, but he was a consistent performer, as the chart (left) reveals. Age did not seem to diminish his abilities; in his last eight Test innings, aged 31–32, he passed 50 five times and scored two of his three Test hundreds.

Sid Barnes's Test batting performances. The red bars indicate the runs that he scored in an innings, with the blue line indicating the batting average in his last ten innings. The blue dots indicate an innings where he remained not out.

Comparing players from Test cricket is an exercise usually flawed by the different conditions, rules of the day and oppositions faced. However, a useful comparison can be made between Barnes and Bradman because they were contemporaries in the same team. Bradman is generally acknowledged as the greatest batsman of all time, fully a third better (statistically) than the next best man in history (see completed career averages chart, right). Barnes and Bradman played together in three series. In those series, Barnes's averages bear comparison to Bradman's, particularly in the more combative Ashes series:

| | Barnes | Bradman |
|---|---|---|
| English cricket team in Australia in 1946–47 | 73.83 | 97.14 |
| Indian cricket team in Australia in 1947–48 | 43.00 | 178.75 |
| Australian cricket team in England in 1948 | 82.25 | 72.57 |

Another way of viewing a player's performance without distortion is by using the world rankings, which have been applied retrospectively to assess the careers of past players. However, the ratings employ a measure to "damp down the oscillation of points of new players". Because Barnes played only 19 Test innings, his performances are weighted to just under 85% of their full value. Consequently, even in his own day, he is rated as no better than seventh in the world, at his peak.

== Test match performance ==
| | | Batting | | | | Bowling | | | |
| Opposition | Matches | Runs | Average | High Score | 100 / 50 | Runs | Wickets | Average | Best (Inns) |
|---|---|---|---|---|---|---|---|---|---|
| England | 9 | 846 | 70.50 | 234 | 2/4 | 118 | 1 | 118.00 | 1/84 |
| India | 3 | 172 | 43.00 | 112 | 1/0 | 100 | 3 | 33.33 | 2/25 |
| New Zealand | 1 | 54 | 54.00 | 54 | 0/1 | – | – | – | – |
| Overall | 13 | 1072 | 63.05 | 234 | 3/5 | 218 | 4 | 54.50 | 2/25 |
