= John Deeble =

Australian academic, health economist and the architect of Medicare in Australia

John Stewart Deeble AO
- Born: 9 July 1931; Donald, Victoria, Australia
- Died: 5 October 2018 (aged 87); Canberra
- Education: Bachelor of Commerce, Melbourne University; Diploma of Hospital Administration, University of New South Wales
- Occupation: Health economist
- Years active: 1965-2015
- Employer: Australian National University
- Known for: Architect of Medicare Australia
- Board member of: Australian Healthcare and Hospitals Association; Australian Health Insurance Commission; Australian Institute of Health and Welfare
- Spouse: Mary Beers Deeble
- Awards: Officer of the Order of Australia

John Stewart Deeble AO (9 July 1931 – 5 October 2018) was an Australian academic, health economist and the architect of Medicare in Australia.

== Early life ==
A native of Wimmera, Deeble grew up near Donald, Victoria, and left school aged 15. His first job was a clerical position at the Peter McCallum Institute in Melbourne. While working he completed a Commerce Degree at Melbourne University and a Diploma of Hospital Administration at the University of New South Wales.

== Career ==
In 1965 he started a research position at the Institute of Applied Economic Research at the University of Melbourne. While working there, Deeble and Richard Scotton coauthored proposals for what became known as Medicare. He was Special Adviser to the ministers for health in the Whitlam and Hawke governments, chairman of the planning committees for both Medibank and Medicare and a commissioner of the Health Insurance Commission for 16 years. He was Patron of the Deeble Institute for Health Policy Research, the research arm of the Australian Healthcare and Hospitals Association.

In 1996, in recognition of his service to community health in the fields of health economics and health insurance policy development, he was awarded the Order of Australia.

He also served as First Assistant Secretary in the Commonwealth Department of Health, Founding Director of the Australian Institute of Health and Welfare, and from 1989 to 2005, Adjunct Professor of Economics at the National Centre for Epidemiology and Population Health at the Australian National University. He was also a World Bank consultant on healthcare financing in Hungary, Turkey and Indonesia, and from 1995 to 2005, an adviser to the government of South Africa.

He died in Canberra on 5 October 2018, aged 87. His funeral was held in Canberra on 19 October and he was buried privately in Woodend, Victoria.
