= Ray Flockton =

Australian cricketer (1930–2011)

Personal information
- Full name: Raymond George Flockton
- Born: 14 March 1930; Paddington, Sydney, New South Wales, Australia
- Died: 22 November 2011 (aged 81); Port Macquarie, New South Wales, Australia
- Batting: Right-handed
- Bowling: Right-arm leg-spin, right-arm medium
- Role: All-rounder

Domestic team information
- Years: Team
- 1951/52–1962/63: New South Wales

Career statistics
Competition	First-class
Matches	35
Runs scored	1,695
Batting average	41.34
100s/50s	2/11
Top score	264 not out
Balls bowled	2,369
Wickets	27
Bowling average	38.03
5 wickets in innings	0
10 wickets in match	0
Best bowling	4/33
Catches/stumpings	11/–
- Source: Cricinfo, 27 August 2025

Raymond George Flockton (14 March 1930 – 22 November 2011) was an Australian cricketer who played first-class cricket for New South Wales from 1951 to 1963.

Flockton was an all-rounder. He played 35 first class cricket matches between 1951 and 1963, with a highest score of 264 not out and best bowling figures of 4 wickets for 33 runs.

He was inadvertently caught up in a controversial incident when Sid Barnes made way in the side for Flockton for a match at the Adelaide Oval. Barnes then acted as twelfth man, and appeared in a suit (rather than 'whites'), carrying unnecessary items such as cigars, iced towels, a mirror and comb, a radio and a clothes brush.

During his playing career, Flockton worked as a Sydney traffic policeman. Later he coached in Canberra before working as an insurance salesman.

Flockton died in November 2011 at his home in Port Macquarie after a long battle with cancer.
