= Phil O'Brien (footballer) =

Australian rules footballer (1930–2020)

Personal information
- Full name: Phil O'Brien
- Born: 31 December 1930
- Died: 13 August 2020 (aged 89); Nagambie, Victoria
- Original team: Donald
- Height: 175 cm (5 ft 9 in)
- Weight: 72 kg (159 lb)
- Position: Forward

Playing career^{1}
Years	Club	Games (Goals)
1951–58	Hawthorn	86 (71)
- ^{1} Playing statistics correct to the end of 1958.

Phil O'Brien (31 December 1930 – 13 August 2020) was an Australian rules footballer who played with Hawthorn in the Victorian Football League (VFL).

== Honours and achievements ==
Individual

- Hawthorn life member
