= Syd Slocomb =

Australian rules footballer (1930–2021)

Personal information
- Full name: Sydney James Slocomb
- Born: 21 May 1930
- Died: 28 February 2021 (aged 90)
- Original team: Lake Boga
- Height: 180 cm (5 ft 11 in)
- Weight: 81 kg (179 lb)

Playing career^{1}
Years	Club	Games (Goals)
1952	St Kilda	2 (0)
- ^{1} Playing statistics correct to the end of 1952.

Sydney James Slocomb (21 May 1930 – 28 February 2021) was an Australian rules footballer who played with St Kilda in the Victorian Football League (VFL).
