= Richard Scotton =

Australian health economist (1930–2019)

Richard "Dick" Scotton
- Born: 19 December 1930; Lithgow, New South Wales, Australia
- Died: 1 October 2019 (aged 88)
- Occupation: Health economist
- Known for: One of the original policy architects of the Australian Medibank universal health insurance program
- Title: Professorial fellow
- Spouse: June Scotton (dec.)
- Children: John, Geoffrey, and Michael

Richard Bailey Scotton AO (19 December 1930 – 1 October 2019) was an Australian health economist, best known as one of the original key policy advisers who designed the Australian Medibank program—Australia's first and current system of publicly funded universal health care, now known as Medicare.

Scotton was educated at the University of Sydney where he obtained a Bachelor of Arts and a Bachelor of Economics. In June 2000 he was appointed an Officer of the Order of Australia (AO) for "service to social reform as a leading health economist and policy analyst, particularly through the development of the Medibank scheme."

== Medibank ==
Between 1965 and 1970, Scotton worked with John Deeble to formulate a universal health care system for Australia. At that time, Australia was coming to the end of more than two decades of conservative government by the Liberal-National Coalition under Prime Ministers Robert Menzies, Harold Holt John Gorton and William McMahon. The Liberal and National parties opposed such a system, and so the plan was initially rejected. However, the Government's attitude changed in 1972 with the election of the reformist Whitlam Labor Government, who had campaigned promising to implement free universal health care in Australia for the first time.

Scotton then entered the public service to implement the Medibank program (known later Medicare) as chairman of the Health Insurance Commission (1973–1976). He worked closely with Social Security Minister Bill Hayden as a Special Advisor for several years. In his autobiography, Hayden said that, "The struggle for Medibank ... was indisputably the most furiously fought domestic policy issues at any time since the ... nationalisation and health services battles of the Chifley Government in 1949." "Dick Scotton and John Deeble, creators of the Medibank health insurance concept", he added, "were remarkably adept academics, endlessly bouncing new policy ideas. What's more, they were able to develop practical working systems with which to implement the ideas."

== Academic career ==
Scotton spent part of his career at the University of Melbourne. He then held senior administrative positions in the Health Commission of Victoria and the Victorian Accident Compensation Commission. He then returned to academia as a professorial fellow in health economics at Monash University's Centre for Health Program Evaluation. In 2000, Scotton retired from full-time work.
