= Jack Lihou =

Australian cricketer (1930–2021)

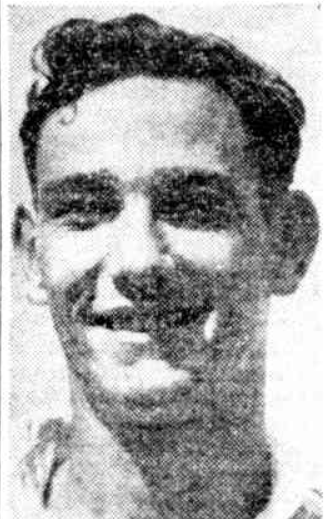

Personal information
- Full name: Jack Lihou
- Born: 9 September 1930; Sandgate, Brisbane, Queensland, Australia
- Died: 6 January 2021 (aged 90); Brisbane, Queensland
- Batting: Right-handed
- Bowling: Right-arm leg-spin

Domestic team information
- Years: Team
- 1955-56 to 1964-65: Queensland

Career statistics
Competition	First-class
Matches	26
Runs scored	115
Batting average	5.22
100s/50s	0/0
Top score	25
Balls bowled	4083
Wickets	50
Bowling average	50.34
5 wickets in innings	0
10 wickets in match	0
Best bowling	3/28
Catches/stumpings	16/0
- Source: Cricket Archive, 17 July 2014

Jack Lihou (9 September 1930 – 6 January 2021) was an Australian first-class cricketer who played 26 matches for Queensland between 1955 and 1965.

== Cricket career ==
A tall leg-spin bowler who worked in Brisbane as a plumber, Lihou had a successful season in Brisbane senior cricket in 1953–54, and was added to the state squad for the next season. He made his first-class debut for Queensland in the Sheffield Shield against Victoria in 1955–56, taking the wickets of Neil Harvey and Sam Loxton. He played four matches in that season but took only five wickets at an average of 66.80.

Lihou played one match in 1959–60, and was not selected in Queensland's first two matches in 1960–61. He returned to the side to play the touring West Indians, and took one wicket, that of Gary Sobers. He remained in the side for the rest of the season and finished with 21 wickets at 37.04, including four wickets in the victory over South Australia in Adelaide and five in the victory over Western Australia in Perth a week later.

Lihou played the first six matches in 1961–62 but took only 11 wickets at 46.81 and lost his spot towards the end of the season. After that he played eight matches in three seasons, in which he took 10 wickets at 78.50.

== Other sports ==
Lihou also played Australian rules football for Sandgate Football Club as a full-back. The Jack Lihou Oval in the Brisbane suburb of Deagon is named after him.
