= Lon Hatherell =

- Born: William Ian Hatherell; 9 September 1930 Toowoomba, Queensland
- Died: 22 May 1986 (aged 55)

Rugby union career
- Position: prop
International career
Years	Team	Apps	(Points)
1952	Wallabies	2	(0)

William Ian "Lon" Hatherell (9 September 1930 – 22 May 1986) was a rugby union player who represented Australia. A prop, he was born in Toowoomba, Queensland, and claimed a total of 2 international rugby caps for Australia. Hatherell died on 22 May 1986, at the age of 55.
