= Paul Mooney (rugby union) =

- Born: Thomas Paul Mooney; 24 August 1930 Brisbane, Queensland
- Died: 24 June 2006 (aged 75) Brisbane

Rugby union career
- Position: hooker
International career
| Years | Team | Apps | (Points) |
| 1954 | Wallabies | 2 | (0) |

Thomas Paul Mooney (24 August 1930 – 24 June 2006) was a rugby union player who represented Australia.

Mooney, a hooker, was born in Brisbane, Queensland and claimed a total of 2 international rugby caps for Australia.Paul played for Easts Rugby and was there first ever Wallaby and also played for West Rugby and is a life member at Wests.
