= Donald McMillan (Ontario politician) =

Canadian politician

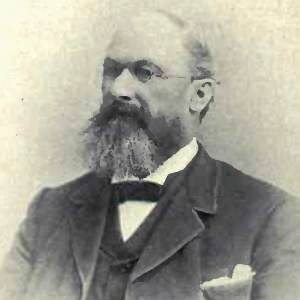
Donald McMillan

Donald McMillan (March 5, 1835 – July 26, 1914) was an Ontario physician and political figure. He served in the Senate of Canada as a Conservative member for Alexandria division from 1884 to 1914.

He was born in Glengarry County in Upper Canada in 1835, studied medicine at Victoria University in Cobourg and qualified as an M.D. in 1865. He served as a justice of the peace and coroner for the United Counties of Stormont, Dundas and Glengarry; he also was a member of the county council. He died in 1914 while still in office.
