= Ian Foreman =

Australian rules footballer (1930–2021)

Personal information
- Full name: Ian Foreman
- Born: 11 October 1930
- Died: 7 January 2021 (aged 90)
- Original team: Braybrook
- Height: 173 cm (5 ft 8 in)
- Weight: 70 kg (154 lb)

Playing career^{1}
Years	Club	Games (Goals)
1952	Footscray	2 (0)
- ^{1} Playing statistics correct to the end of 1952.

Ian Foreman (11 October 1930 – 7 January 2021) was an Australian rules footballer who played with Footscray in the Victorian Football League (VFL).
