= Cricket whites =

White clothing worn in the sport of cricket

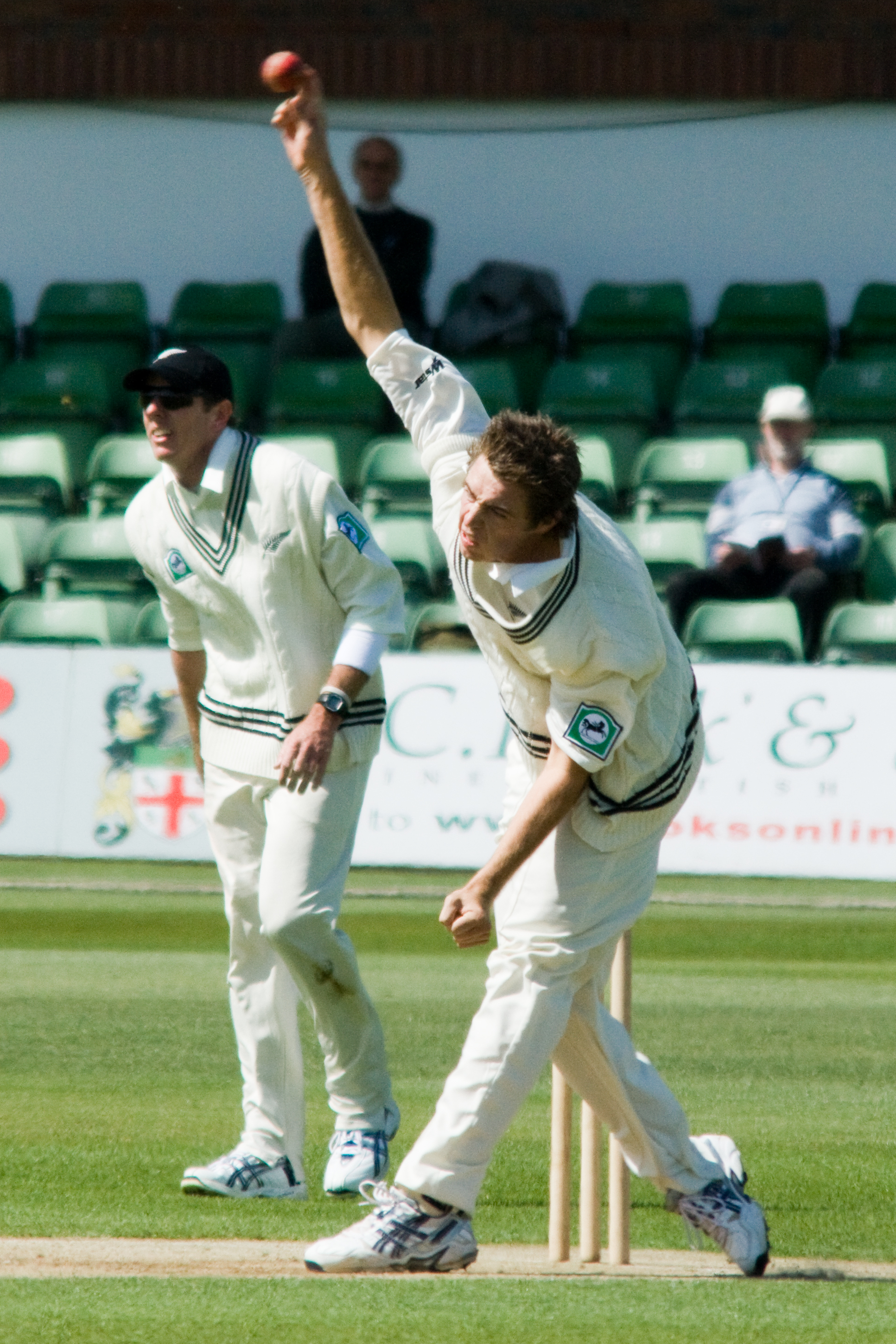
New Zealand cricketers wearing cricket whites

Cricket whites, also known as flannels, are the white or cream coloured clothing traditionally worn by most cricketers, and usually consist of trousers, shirt and a jumper.

Flannels were originally made from a variety of flannel materials. Typically, modern flannels will have trousers made with a high elastic content, to prevent damage while fielding. Shirts and jumpers can be short or long-sleeved, the former being particularly favoured by bowlers. Wicketkeepers mostly wear long-sleeved shirts, in order to avoid abrasions from the grass when diving for the ball, which is also true for some players while batting due to a similar risk. Jumpers are traditionally made with a cable-knit design.

Today, many competitions (particularly in the shortened one-day version of cricket) are played in coloured kit, also sometimes known as "pyjamas". At the international level, whites are only worn during Test cricket. One Day International and Twenty20 matches are played with the teams wearing team uniforms in particular colours. One-Day Internationals were first played in whites but since December 2000 all ODI cricket has been played in coloured clothing – for example, the Black Caps of New Zealand wear a black uniform.

The term flannels is also used in baseball, especially in a historical context when the uniforms were made of wool flannel.

== See also ==
- Cricket clothing and equipment
