= Tony Bull (footballer) =

Australian rules footballer (1930–2019)

Personal information
- Full name: Herbert Anthony Bull
- Born: 24 May 1930
- Died: 22 November 2019 (aged 89)
- Original team: South Bendigo
- Height: 177 cm (5 ft 10 in)
- Weight: 70 kg (154 lb)
- Position: Rover

Playing career^{1}
Years	Club	Games (Goals)
1953–57	Melbourne	31 (10)
- ^{1} Playing statistics correct to the end of 1957.

Herbert Anthony Bull (24 May 1930 – 22 November 2019) was an Australian rules footballer who played with Melbourne in the Victorian Football League (VFL).

After retiring as a player, Bull became a junior coach and recruiting officer for Melbourne.
