= Ian MacMillan (rugby union) =

- Born: Donald Ian MacMillan; 22 September 1930 Toowoomba, Queensland
- Died: April 1982 (aged 51) New Caledonia
- School: Toowoomba Grammar School

Rugby union career
- Position: Flanker
International career
Years	Team	Apps	(Points)
1950	Wallabies	2	(0)

Donald Ian MacMillan (22 September 1930 – April 1982) was a rugby union player who represented Australia.

MacMillan was born in Toowoomba, Queensland, and educated at Toowoomba Grammar School.

A flanker, MacMillan gained two Test caps for Australia against the 1950 British Lions, at the Gabba and Sydney Cricket Ground. He played his club rugby in Toowoomba and for the GPS club in Brisbane.
