= Where Sleeping Dogs Lie =

1991 film by Charles Finch

- Theatrical release poster
- Directed by: Charles Finch
- Written by: Yolande Turner; Charles Finch
- Produced by: Mario Sotela
- Starring: Dylan McDermott; Tom Sizemore; Sharon Stone
- Cinematography: Miles Cook
- Edited by: Gene M. Gamache
- Music by: Hans Zimmer; Mark Mancina
- Production company: Sotela Pictures
- Distributed by: August Entertainment (United States); Columbia TriStar Film Distributors International (international)
- Release dates: November 13, 1991 (Santa Barbara Film Festival); June 18, 1993 (United States)
- Running time: 91 minutes
- Country: United States
- Language: English

Where Sleeping Dogs Lie is a 1991 American neo noir thriller film directed by Charles Finch and starring Dylan McDermott, Tom Sizemore, and Sharon Stone. The primary location for the film was C.E. Toberman Estate in Hollywood, a large Mediterranean-style, 22-room house built at the top of Camino Palmero in 1928 by C. E. Toberman.

== Plot ==
A murder mystery writer misreads the nervous man he bullies in a spooky Hollywood mansion. A psychological thriller with an aspiring writer who was recently evicted moves into a run down California mansion; an enigmatic tenant collaborates on his novel as the "real" killer of the family that the writer is writing about. The writer does not like writing about "blood and guts" to have a best-seller; yet, desperation finds him moving into a house where the inhabitants were murdered by a serial killer, still-at-large, the "real killer" moves into the house as a tenant, helps write the book, then reveals that he killed the family.

== Cast ==
- Dylan McDermott as Bruce Simmons
- Charles Finch as Evan Best
- Sharon Stone as Serena Black
- Ron Karabatsos as Stan Reeb
- Tom Sizemore as Eddie Hale
- Mary Woronov as Woman Tourist
- David Q Combs as Man Tourist
- Vanna Bonta as Serena's Secretary
- Liza Whitcraft as Serena's Secretary
- Phoebe Stone as Little Girl
- Shawne Rowe as Telegram Clown
- Richard Zavaglia as Detective Clifton
- Jillian McWhirter as Dol Whitney
- Brett Cullen as John Whitney

== See also ==
- List of American films of 1991
