= Whose War Is It? (film) =

- Narrated by: Peter Finch
- Production company: Commonwealth Film Laboratories
- Distributed by: Department of Information
- Release date: 1943
- Country: Australia
- Language: English

Whose War Is It? is a 1943 Australian propaganda film from the Department of Information. It was released theatrically.

The film was a short to raise money for War Loans. It was made by Commonwealth Film Laboratories and starred Jack Allen from the DOI while Peter Finch provided the commentary.

== Related media ==
Other war shorts for the Australian government from Commonwealth Film Laboratories included:

- Australia Has Wings (1941)
- It's the Navy (1941)
- Forgotten Men (1942) - directed by Ralph Smart
- Grumblens (1943) with Muriel Steinbeck, Wilfrid Thomas, and Lloyd Lamble
- Back to Attack (1943)
