= Grumblens =

1943 Australian propaganda film

The Grumblens
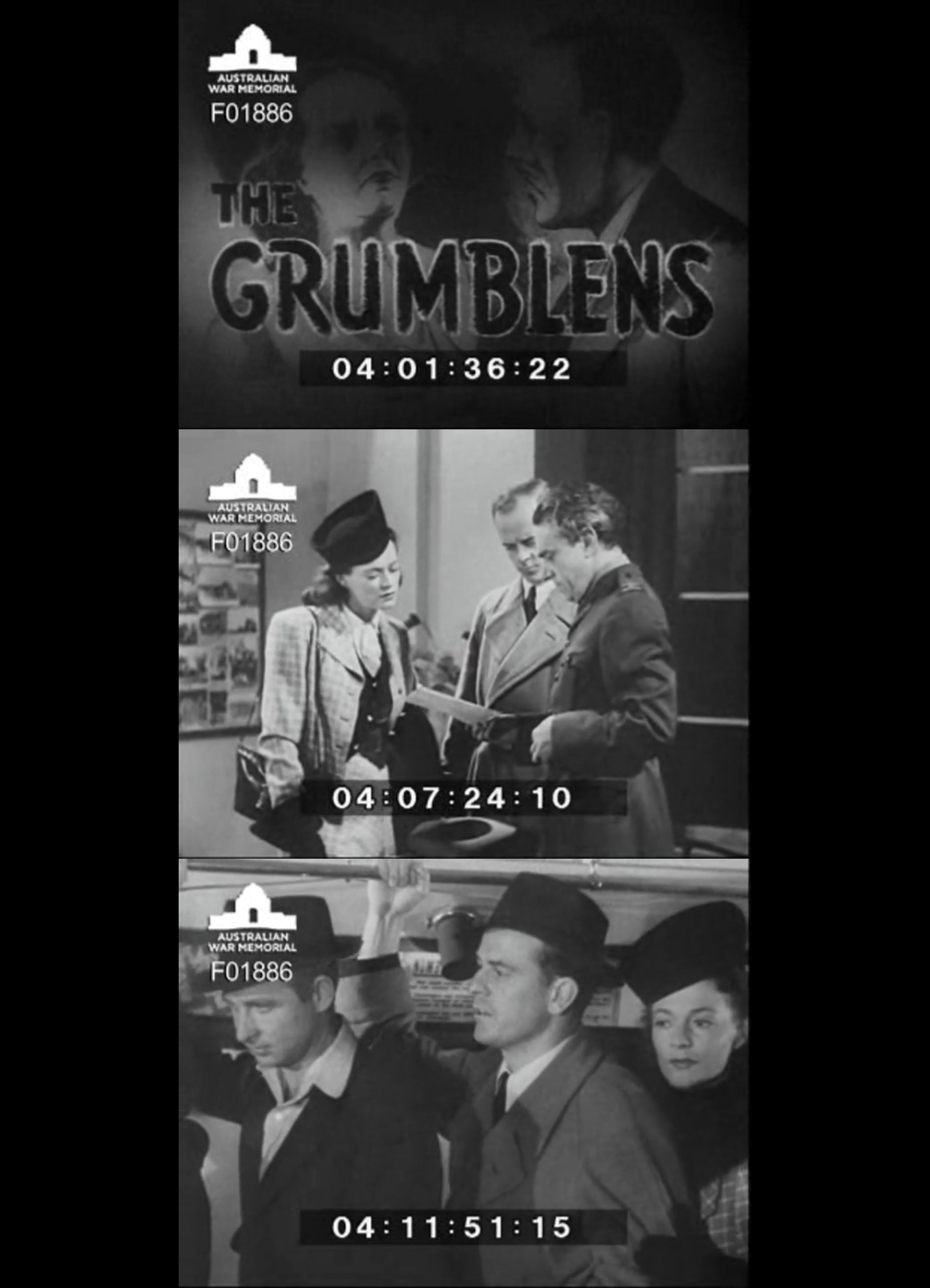
- Directed by: George D. Malcolm
- Cinematography: Harry Malcolm
- Edited by: Gus Lowry
- Production company: Commonwealth Film Laboratories
- Distributed by: Department of Information
- Release date: July 1943
- Running time: 12 minutes
- Country: Australia
- Language: English

The Grumblens is a 1943 Australian propaganda film from the Department of Information. It combined documentary footage with dramatic sections. The film released theatrically.

== Premise ==
A couple, Mr and Mrs Grumblens, complain about the fact that the war means they are unable to buy luxuries like beer at the pub. A war correspondent shames them by pointing out how their shortages contribute to the war effort.

== Cast ==
- Wilfrid Thomas as war correspondent
- Lloyd Lamble as Mr Grumblen
- Muriel Steinbeck as Mrs Grumblen
- Russel Burroughs as passenger in bus

== Reception ==
The Daily Telegraph said "Slickly produced, informative in explanation of shortages, the "Grumblens" strike a naive patch here and there: the propaganda gets preachy. On the whole, however, it is... to sum up: a good job."

Smith's Weekly said "Wilfrid Thomas delivers his homily to the selfish couple with good effect, the comedy scenes are refreshing, and the picture may do some good to those people who complain that the war has deprived them of what are really non-essentials in life."

Other war shorts for the Australian government from Commonwealth Film Laboratories included:

- Australia Has Wings (1941)
- It's the Navy (1941)
- Forgotten Men (1942) - directed by Ralph Smart
- Back to Attack (1943)
