= The Day (1960 film) =

- Directed by: Peter Finch
- Written by: Peter Finch; Yolande Turner
- Starring: Antonion Costa
- Cinematography: John Von Kotze
- Edited by: Maurice Rootes
- Music by: Sir Eugene Goossens
- Release date: March 1961
- Running time: 26 mins
- Language: English
- Budget: £5,000

The Day (also known as Antonito) is a 1961 British short fictional documentary-style film directed by Peter Finch and starring Antonion Costa. It was written by Finch and Yolande Turner.

== Plot ==
A little Spanish boy travels from his village on the Spanish island of Ibiza with his donkey and cart to the bring relatives home to see a new-born child.

== Cast ==
- Antonion Costa as the boy
- Alexander Murray
- Thomas Blades

== Production ==
Finch owned a farm on Ibiza where the film was shot in 1960.

== Soundtrack ==
Music, for string quartet, percussion and flute, was by Sir Eugene Goossens.

== Reception ==
The film was released at the Academy Cinema in London in support of The World of Apu in March 1961.

"Shows what can be done with purely visual effects," wrote The Daily Telegraph. "Most commendably made" said The Guardian. The Evening Standard called it "a little wonder... a simple joy." "Errs a little on the side of artiness", said the Daily Herald, "but it has been made with love, understanding and respect."

The Monthly Film Bulletin wrote: "Antonio, a young Ibizan, travels all day to a distant town to collect his relatives and bring them back to his father's farm to see the latest baby. His reactions on the journey are described in friendly detail: the delight in flowing water and insects is carefully played against the terror of a scarecrow and a row of flapping shirts. Though John von Kotze's camerawork is too often self-consciously reminiscent of The Family of Man type of photography, and the boy's sensibility is too often interpreted in terms of images taken from Visconti and Vigo, this remains an attractive short. The qualities one associates with Peter Finch as an actor – of an elegance playing against a rough warmth – are given full play here in his new role as a director."

Kine Weekly wrote: "Peter Finch has invested the simple annal with charm and an understanding of the wondering mind of a child that stamp it as a masterpiece in miniature. The photography is sensitive, the background music of Sir Eugene Goossens plaved by the Hirsch String Quartet adds appreciably to the picture's charm and the small local farmboy, Antonio, plays with complete naturalness. Very Good."

Finch's biographer, Trader Faulkner, later wrote:

The Day shows Peter’s visual flair for capturing the essence of Spanish peasant life and the Spanish ambiente. Everything is suggested, nothing is ever stated. Shot in black and white it is full of beautiful, comic touches: the little boy filling his hat with water to give his donkey a drink; his attempts to reach the large door-knocker, just out of reach because he is too small. The humour is completely Spanish, ironical, satirical and reveals Peter as a director capable of identifying as a Spaniard to bring out the childlike quality of his visual narrative. The Day tells you more about Finchie than any of his forty-odd film performances, because it is Peter.

Finch later considered directing a film from Derek Monsey’s novel The Hero, about a British officer who escapes from a P.O.W. camp in Italy during the Second World War and falls in love with a local partisan girl. Ralph Peterson did a treatment but Finch ultimately elected not to try to make the film and The Day remained the only movie he directed.

== Accolades ==
The film won awards at the 1961 Venice Festival of Children's Films, and Cork Festival in Ireland.

The film screened at the 1961 Sydney Film Festival as Antonito. It was released in Sydney cinemas in 1963 in support of an Ingmar Bergman film The Naked Night.
