= George D. Malcolm =

Australian producer, cameraman and executive

George David Malcolm (1904–1977) was an Australian producer, cameraman and executive.

For several years he worked at Commonwealth Film Laboratories as a producer.

== Select credits ==
- On Our Selection (1932)
- The Squatter's Daughter (1933) - cinematographer, editor
- The Man They Could Not Hang (1934) - cinematographer
- Splendid Fellows (1934) - cinematographer
- Conquest (1935) (short) - cinematographer
- Eaglets (1936) (short) - producer
- Mystery Island (1937) - producer, cinematographer
- Typhoon Treasure (1938) - cinematographer
- Seven Little Australians (1939) - cinematographer
- Australia Has Wings (1941) - producer
- Grumblens (1943) (short)
- King of the Ring (1949) (short) - producer, director
