= Eaglets (1935 film) =

- Directed by: George D. Malcolm
- Screenplay by: George D. Malcolm
- Cinematography: George D. Malcolm
- Edited by: George D. Malcolm
- Production company: Commonwealth Film Laboratories
- Release date: December 1935
- Running time: 11 minutes
- Country: Australia
- Language: English

Eaglets is a 1935 Australian documentary short film that was theatrically released. It was made by Commonwealth Film Laboratories to promote the Model Flying Club of Australia. George D. Malcolm directed, shot, wrote and edited it. Keith Macpherson Smith was a patron of the club. The film runs for eleven minutes.

According to the Sydney Morning Herald "Scenes of the activities of the club are woven round the story of the conversion of two schoolboys from flying kites to flying model aeroplanes."

Smith's Weekly called it "an excellent example of how this sort of thing should be done."

The Launceston Examiner called it "a fine piece of model aero propaganda."
