= Bad Girls (1994 film) =

1994 film

- Theatrical release poster
- Directed by: Jonathan Kaplan
- Screenplay by: Ken Friedman; Yolande Finch
- Story by: Albert S. Ruddy; Charles Finch; Gray Frederickson
- Produced by: Albert S. Ruddy; Andre E. Morgan; Charles Finch
- Starring: Madeleine Stowe; Mary Stuart Masterson; Drew Barrymore; Andie MacDowell; James Russo; James LeGros; Robert Loggia; Dermot Mulroney
- Cinematography: Ralf D. Bode
- Edited by: Jane Kurson
- Music by: Jerry Goldsmith
- Distributed by: 20th Century Fox
- Release date: April 22, 1994
- Running time: 99 minutes
- Country: United States
- Language: English
- Budget: $25–35 million
- Box office: $23 million

Bad Girls is a 1994 American Western film directed by Jonathan Kaplan, and written by Ken Friedman and Yolande Turner. It stars Madeleine Stowe, Mary Stuart Masterson, Andie MacDowell, and Drew Barrymore. The film follows four former prostitutes on the run following a justifiable homicide and prison escape, who later encounter difficulties involving bank robbery and Pinkerton detectives.

The film was originally conceived as a feminist Western and a low-budget independent film, until producers Albert Ruddy and André Morgan brought in 20th Century Fox. The involvement of a major studio substantially increased the film's budget and necessitated the casting of big-name actresses. Principal photography began in July 1993 in Sonora, California with director Tamra Davis at the helm, but shortly into filming, producers fired Davis and reconceptualized the movie to be more of an action film. Jonathan Kaplan was hired to replace Davis.

Bad Girls opened in North American theaters on April 22, 1994. It received largely negative reviews and was a box office disappointment, with critics opining that the film squandered its encouraging premise and misused its four female leads.

== Plot ==
Cody, Anita, Eileen and Lily work together in a brothel. When Anita is abused by a customer, Cody kills the man after he opens fire on her. Narrowly escaping from a lynch mob, they are pursued by Pinkerton detectives hired by the widow of Colonel Clayborne (the dead customer). A man they meet on the road, McCoy, warns them of the pursuit.

They discuss riding to Oregon and starting a new life by taking up the claim to land inherited by Anita when her husband died of cholera. Cody offers to fund their new start from savings she has accumulated over the years.

Going to the bank where Cody's savings are held, as she tries to close her account and make a withdrawal, the Pinkerton detectives catch up with her and try to arrest her. Leaving the bank manager's office, they find themselves in the middle of a bank robbery being staged by Kid Jarrett, a former lover of Cody's. He helps her escape from arrest, but takes her money and tells her to find him.

During the escape, Eileen is arrested. Cody decides to go after the money and Kid Jarrett, telling Anita and Lily to wait in hiding. Instead, they return to town to break Eileen out of jail.

Cody's meeting with Kid Jarrett and his father Frank Jarrett does not go well. As Kid Jarrett has not forgiven her for running out on him, he flogs her. Later, she is found unconscious by McCoy, who brings her to a healer in town and puts the Pinkerton detectives off her trail.

McCoy, Cody and the other three women meet up on the ranch of a farmer who'd been guarding Eileen's cell (and whom they'd tricked into releasing her). Cody plans revenge on Kid Jarrett. They foil a train robbery and steal his loot, at the cost of Lily being abducted. In turn, they abduct Frank Jarrett.

Regrouping again on the ranch, Anita leaves the others, frustrated with their revenge-motivated misadventures. She goes to a lawyer in town and finds out that the claim is only valid in the hands of her husband - as a woman, she cannot claim the land in Oregon.

Frank Jarrett antagonizes his captors until McCoy shoots him. Angry over it, Cody sends McCoy away. Meanwhile, Lily is being raped by her captors. When McCoy stages a one-man rescue attempt, he is captured, but Lily escapes.

Reunited, Cody, Anita and Eileen go to rescue Lily and meet her on the road. When she tells them that McCoy has been captured, they continue towards Kid Jarrett's hideout, and offer to trade the stolen loot for McCoy, who has been flogged and tortured. Kid agrees, then shoots McCoy as soon as the loot is handed over. He gives Cody the money he stole from her.

While retreating, one of Lily's would-be rapists taunts her, triggering a shootout that results in the deaths of Kid's entire gang.

After the shootout, Eileen marries the rancher, while Lily, Cody and Anita head west to start a new life, mentioning the Klondike Gold Rush of 1896. On the trail, they overtake the Pinkerton detectives, who do not see them.

== Cast ==
- Madeleine Stowe as Cody Zamora
- Mary Stuart Masterson as Anita Crown
- Drew Barrymore as Lily Laronette
- Andie MacDowell as Eileen Spenser
- James Russo as "Kid" Jarrett
- James LeGros as William Tucker
- Robert Loggia as Frank Jarrett
- Dermot Mulroney as Josh McCoy
- Jim Beaver as Pinkerton Detective Graves
- Nick Chinlund as Pinkerton Detective O'Brady
- Harry Northup as Preacher Sloan
- Don Hood as Echo City Sheriff
- Rodger Boyce as Agua Dulce Bank Manager
- Cooper Huckabee as Deputy Earl
- Beulah Quo as Herbalist

== Production ==
The original director was Tamra Davis. The script, written by Yolande Finch and Davis' close friend Becky Johnston, was envisioned as an artsy film that would "foreground the political themes of the Western". Davis lobbied for New Line Cinema to make the film with her as the director. The budget was initially set at $6 million. The project was abandoned until 20th Century Fox agreed to finance it, assigning producers Albert Ruddy and André Morgan to be in charge. The film then became a high-profile production with name actresses in talks to star, and the budget was upped to $16.5 million.

Just before filming began in Sonora, California, Davis was handed a 75-page script rewrite, and the actresses reportedly received only one day's worth of weapons training and a minimal amount of rehearsal time. Nine days into filming, Davis was fired. Ruddy and Morgan maintained that the reasoning was Davis falling behind schedule, but reports also speculated that in contrast to Davis' vision, the studio wanted a "sexier version of the $43 million-grossing Young Guns". Madeleine Stowe told Entertainment Weekly at the time, "Tamra had nothing to work with. There is no director, given the kind of production she was given, who could have come up with what they wanted." Co-star Dermot Mulroney said the studio had been dissatisfied when the dailies showed "women just sitting around, and they paid for this big action film".

In the wake of Davis' firing, Fox hired producer Lynda Obst, director Jonathan Kaplan, cinematographer Ralf Bode, and screenwriter Ken Friedman. The budget then went up to $20 million. Production was shut down for three weeks, during which the script was rewritten to be more action-oriented and the principal cast attended a "cowboy camp" supervised by stunt coordinator Walter Scott. Discussing the studio's hiring changes, Obst said, "Jonathan is like a woman. His Heart Like a Wheel was the first feminist movie that knocked me out. He's more of a feminist than I am. I kept saying, 'Women do not want to ride into the sunset without men. We like men.'" Obst later expressed that the studio's meddling had made for a troublesome production.

Stowe said, "I had actually liked the first script very much and would never have agreed to do it otherwise. But I guess it wasn't translating." Stowe later recalled the shoot as an unpleasant experience, with the only positive being that it introduced her to Texas, where she later bought a home.

The railroad scenes were filmed on the Sierra Railroad in Tuolumne County, California. When filming resumed with Kaplan, the production moved to Brackettville, Texas for eight weeks.

The ending of Bad Girls was reshot after negative test screenings. Said Mary Stuart Masterson, "The [original] story was more about each of us getting our money and going our separate ways."

== Soundtrack ==
The film's music was written by Jerry Goldsmith, who composed the music as a cross between the style of his 1960s westerns and a contemporary sound. The soundtrack has been released twice; through 20th Century Fox Film Scores on 10 May 1994 and an extended, limited edition through La-La Land Records and Fox Music on 28 June 2011.

Track list for the La-La Land edition (tracks in italics also on the Fox release, asterisked tracks include previously unreleased material):

1. The John (2:19)
2. The Hanging (2:06)
3. Which Way? (:42)
4. The Snake (1:20)
5. The Saw Mill (1:56)
6. Keep Moving (:57)
7. Bank Job* (5:16)
8. The Gang/The Posse (:56)
9. Return to the Fold (4:06)
10. Don't Hurt Me (1:45)
11. Jail Break (3:27)
12. No Money (2:09)
13. The Guests (:36)
14. Welcome to My Home (1:20)
15. The Pleasure of Your Company (:48)
16. Ambush (5:45)
17. What's Your Name? (1:18)
18. The Claim (:25)
19. Together (:39)
20. I Shot Him* (2:46)
21. Put It On (1:32)
22. River Crossing (:34)
23. Rescued (3:03)
24. Josh's Death (3:41)
25. No Bullets (3:53)
26. My Land/End Credits (6:53)

== Reception ==
=== Critical response ===
Bad Girls received overwhelmingly negative reviews from critics upon its release and as of 2021 holds a 13% "Rotten" rating on Rotten Tomatoes based on 23 reviews. Audiences surveyed by CinemaScore gave Bad Girls a grade of "B-" on a scale of A+ to F.

On April 22, 1994, Roger Ebert wrote for the Chicago Sun-Times: "What a good idea, to make a Western about four tough women. And what a sad movie." He concluded, "The failure of 'Bad Girls' is all the more poignant because the actresses are at the top of their forms right now, and could have been inspired by a more ambitious production. Think of Stowe in 'Blink,' MacDowell in 'Four Weddings And A Funeral,' Masterson in 'Fried Green Tomatoes,' Barrymore in 'Gun Crazy.' Better still, see them in those films, and reflect how lame they seem in this concoction."

Janet Maslin of The New York Times ridiculed the film as "Cowpoke Barbie" and commented the only positive aspect to the film was its cast. Maslin said Stowe gives the film's most interesting performance, but she lamented Masterson has so little to do. She also commented "Jonathan Kaplan directs 'Bad Girls' in a surprisingly stilted manner, without the slightest feel for the western genre in either its traditional or neo-feminist forms. The film feels stiff and looks awkward, despite Mr. Kaplan's usually serious, accomplished way of telling a story."

The Morning Call praised the film's production values, saying "the authentic-appearing sets give one a sense of the 1890s west in the waning days of the American frontier. Filter-laden cinematography imparts a lived-in, burnished look to the west Texas landscape where the movie was partly made". It said "the best performance among the female leads is by Drew Barrymore, as Lilly Laronette, who chews the tobacco out of the pulp fiction script", but lamented that the film squanders the talents of Stowe, MacDowell, and Masterson.

In a retrospective review for Grantland, Molly Lambert wrote, "Bad Girls is a campy romp that's never very much fun. Madeleine Stowe has the most to do as tomboy Cody Zamora, Andie MacDowell is better than usual as a Southern belle madame, Mary Stewart Masterson wears prairie dresses, and Drew Barrymore shows her boobs." She added the outcome "is particularly disappointing because a Western about four prostitutes swearing vengeance has so much potential".

=== Box office ===
The film opened in the number 1 position with $5,012,200, but dropped to number 4 in its second week of release. The film grossed $15,240,435 in the United States and Canada and $23 million worldwide.

== Year-end lists ==
- Top 10 worst (listed alphabetically, not ranked) – Mike Mayo, The Roanoke Times
- Worst films (not ranked) – Jeff Simon, The Buffalo News
- Dishonorable mention – Glenn Lovell, San Jose Mercury News
- Dishonorable mention – Dan Craft, The Pantagraph

== Home media ==
The film was released on VHS and on DVD, which contains an uncut extended version.
