= Peter Finch =

English and Australian actor (1916–1977)

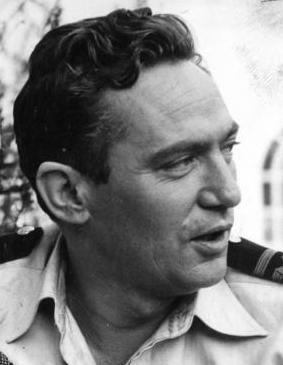
- Finch in 1955
- Born: Frederick George Peter Ingle Finch; 28 September 1916; London, England
- Died: 14 January 1977 (aged 60); Beverly Hills, California, U.S.
- Resting place: Hollywood Forever Cemetery
- Occupation: Actor
- Years active: 1934–1977
- Spouses: Tamara Tchinarova (m. 1943; div. 1959) Yolande Turner (m. 1959; div. 1965) Eletha Barrett (m. 1973)
- Children: 4; including Charles Finch
- Awards: See below
- Military career
- Allegiance: Australia
- Branch: Australian Army
- Service years: 1941–1945
- Rank: Sergeant
- Unit: 2/1st Field Regiment (Australia)
- Conflicts: World War II; Bombing of Darwin

Frederick George Peter Ingle Finch (28 September 1916 – 14 January 1977) was an English and Australian actor.

Born in London, he emigrated to Australia at the age of ten and was raised in Sydney, where he worked in vaudeville and radio before becoming a star of Australian films. Joining the Old Vic Company after World War II, he achieved widespread critical success in Britain for both stage and screen performances. One of British cinema's most celebrated leading men of the time, Finch won five BAFTA Awards for Best Actor, and the Academy Award in the same category for his portrayal of crazed television anchorman Howard Beale in the 1976 film Network. He died only two months before the 49th Academy Awards, making him the first person to win a posthumous Oscar in an acting category.

According to the British Film Institute, "it is arguable that no other actor ever chalked up such a rewarding CV in British films, and he accumulated the awards to bolster this view".

== Early life ==
=== Family ===
Frederick George Peter Ingle Finch was born in South Kensington, London, on 28 September 1916 to Alicia Gladys (née Fisher), the daughter of a Kent barrister. The previous year, Alicia married George Ingle Finch, an Australian-born chemist who had moved to Britain in 1912 and served during the First World War with the Royal Army Ordnance Depot and the Royal Field Artillery. Peter learned in his mid-forties that his biological father was Wentworth Edward Dallas Campbell, an Indian Army officer. George Finch divorced his wife in 1920 on the grounds of her adultery with Campbell. Alicia married Campbell in 1922.

=== Early childhood ===
George gained custody of Peter, who was taken from his biological mother and raised by his adoptive paternal grandmother, Laura Finch (formerly Black), in Vaucresson, France. In 1925 Laura took Peter with her to Adyar, a theosophical community near Madras, India, for a number of months, and the young boy lived for a time in a Buddhist monastery. Perhaps as a result of his childhood contact with Buddhism, Finch always claimed to be a Buddhist. He is reported to have said: "I think a man dying on a cross is a ghastly symbol for a religion. And I think a man sitting under a bo tree and becoming enlightened is a beautiful one."

In 1926 he was sent to Australia to live with his great-uncle Edward Herbert Finch at Greenwich Point in Sydney. For three years he attended the local school, then North Sydney Intermediate High School, until 1929. RAF pilot and author Paul Brickhill was a school friend.

== Early career in Australia ==
After abandoning school at 15, Finch went into various jobs, including as a copy boy for the Sydney Sun.

However, he was more interested in acting, and in late 1933 appeared in a play, Caprice, with the New Sydney Repertory Company.

In 1934–35 he appeared in a number of productions for Doris Fitton at the Savoy Theatre, some with a young Sumner Locke Elliott. He also worked as a sideshow spruiker at the Sydney Royal Easter Show, in vaudeville with Joe Cody and as a foil to American comedian Bert le Blanc. At age 19 Finch toured Australia with George Sorlie's travelling troupe.

=== Radio work ===
He did radio acting with Hugh Denison's BSA Players (for Broadcasting Service Association, later to become Macquarie Players). He came to the attention of Australian Broadcasting Commission radio drama producer Lawrence H. Cecil, who was to serve as his coach and mentor throughout 1939 and 1940. He was "Chris" in the Children's Session and the first Muddle-Headed Wombat.

He later starred with Neva Carr Glyn in a popular series by Max Afford, portraying husband-and-wife detectives Jeffery and Elizabeth Blackburn, and also appeared in other ABC radio plays.

=== First films ===
Finch's first screen performance was in the short film The Magic Shoes (1935), an adaptation of the Cinderella fairy tale, where Finch played Prince Charming.

He made his feature film debut in Ken G. Hall's Dad and Dave Come to Town (1938), playing a small comic role. His performance was well received and Hall subsequently cast Finch in a larger role in Mr. Chedworth Steps Out (1939), supporting Cecil Kellaway.

Finch appeared in a war propaganda film, The Power and the Glory (1941), playing a fifth columnist.

== War service ==
Finch enlisted in the Australian Army on 2 June 1941. He served in the Middle East and was an anti-aircraft gunner during the Bombing of Darwin.

During his war service Finch was given leave to act in radio, theatre and film. He appeared in a number of propaganda shorts, including Another Threshold (1942), These Stars Are Mine (1943), While There is Still Time (1943) and South West Pacific (1943), the latter for Ken G. Hall. He also appeared in two of the few Australian feature films made during the war, The Rats of Tobruk (1944) and the less distinguished Red Sky at Morning (1944).

Finch produced and performed Army Concert Party work, and in 1945 toured bases and hospitals with two Terence Rattigan plays he directed, French Without Tears and While the Sun Shines. He narrated the widely seen documentaries Whose War Is It? (1943), Jungle Patrol (1944) and Sons of the Anzacs (1945).

Finch was discharged from the army on 31 October 1945 at the rank of sergeant.

== Post-war career in Australia ==
After the war, Finch continued to work extensively in radio and established himself as Australia's leading actor in that medium, winning Macquarie Awards for best actor in 1946 and 1947. He helped create the radio series The Sundowner a vehicle for Chips Rafferty.

He also worked as a compere, producer and writer.

In 1946, Finch co-founded the Mercury Theatre Company, which put on a number of productions in Sydney over the next few years (initially in the diminutive St James' Hall), as well as running a theatre school.

Finch continued to appear in the (rare) Australian feature films made around this time including A Son Is Born (1946) and Eureka Stockade (1949). He was a leading contender to play Sir Charles Kingsford Smith in Smithy (1946) but lost out to Ron Randell. According to Filmink Finch was recognised "as the best radio actor in the country, although there was a lot of reservations about whether the skinny, cheekbone-y occasional Buddhist was handsome enough to be a leading man."

Finch was also involved in some documentaries, narrating Indonesia Calling (1946) and helping make Primitive Peoples about the people of Arnhem Land.

=== Visit of Laurence Olivier and Vivien Leigh, and return to Britain ===
Laurence Olivier and Vivien Leigh toured Australia in 1948 with the Old Vic Company. They attended the Mercury production of The Imaginary Invalid on the factory floor of O'Brien's Glass Factory starring Finch. Olivier was impressed with Finch's acting and encouraged him to move to London, his birthplace, which he did that year.

== British career ==
=== Theatrical success ===
When Finch arrived in Britain, success came relatively early. Harry Watt arranged for a screen test at Ealing Studios, which led to Finch being cast as a murderous actor in the movie Train of Events (1949) under the direction of Basil Dearden.

While making the film, Olivier cast Finch as a Pole in a stage play at The Old Vic, James Bridie's Daphne Laureola (1949) supporting Edith Evans. This was a significant critical and commercial success and established Finch in London immediately. Olivier signed Finch to a five-year contract. When Train of Events was released, critic C. A. Lejeune praised Finch's work in the London Observer, commenting that he "adds good cheekbones to a quick intelligence and is likely to become a cult, I fear." The Scotsman said Finch "should be regarded as one of the most hopeful recruits to the British screen."

Finch had a small role as an Australian prisoner of war in the World War two drama The Wooden Horse (1950), directed by Jack Lee; this film would be the third-most-popular film at the British box office in 1950.

Finch's performance as a Pole in Daphne Laureola led to his casting as a Polish soldier in The Miniver Story (1950), the British-filmed sequel to the wartime morale boosting film Mrs. Miniver; unlike its predecessor, it was poorly received critically, but it did give Finch an experience of working for a movie financed by a major Hollywood studio.

During this time, Finch continued to appear on stage in various productions while under contract to Olivier. He directed a stage production of The White Falcon in January 1950. In February 1950 he toured in a production of The Damascus Blade by Bridget Boland under the direction of Olivier, co starring with John Mills.

Finch returned to the London stage in Captain Carvallo by Denis Cannan, once more directed by Olivier.

Finch's closeness to the Olivier family led to an affair with Olivier's wife, Vivien Leigh, which began in 1948, and continued on and off for several years, ultimately ending because of Leigh's deteriorating mental condition.

In March 1951 Finch replaced Dirk Bogarde for six weeks in a production of Point of Departure by Jean Anouilh. Later that year he played Iago opposite Orson Welles in a production of Othello, directed by Welles.

Despite his stage experience, according to the Sunday Times Finch, like his mentor Olivier, had stage fright, and as the 1950s progressed he worked increasingly in film.

=== Rising film reputation ===
Finch's film career received a considerable boost when cast as the Sheriff of Nottingham in The Story of Robin Hood (1952) for Walt Disney, opposite Richard Todd.

In 1952 Finch performed at St James's Theatre, King Street, London, in Sir Laurence Olivier's and Gilbert Miller's The Happy Time a comedy by Samuel Taylor. He played the part of Papa. He also did Romeo and Juliet at the Old Vic, playing Mercutio, to strong reviews.

He then made two films for Alexander Korda. In The Story of Gilbert and Sullivan (1953) Finch played Richard D'Oyly Carte opposite Robert Morley and Maurice Evans in the lead; the resulting movie was a box office disappointment. In The Heart of the Matter (1953), from the Graham Greene novel, Finch played a priest opposite Trevor Howard; his performance was a critical success.

Finch returned to the stage at the Old Vic with an appearance in An Italian Straw Hat by Eugène Labiche and Marc Michel adapted by Thomas Walton. He then received an offer from Paramount to star in Elephant Walk (1954), shot in Ceylon and Los Angeles. The part was intended for Laurence Olivier who turned it down, but Vivien Leigh agreed to play the female lead; Dana Andrews was the other star. The circumstances of production were turbulent; Leigh had a nervous breakdown during production, leading to her being replaced by Elizabeth Taylor. The experience helped sour Finch on a Hollywood career and he would only work occasionally there for the rest of his career.

Back in England, Finch was cast as the villain Flambeau in Father Brown (1954), receiving superb reviews opposite Alec Guinness in the title role. He narrated a documentary The Queen in Australia and had his first real star part in the Group 3/British Lion comedy, Make Me an Offer (1954), playing an antiques dealer. He was then a villain in the medieval swashbuckler The Dark Avenger (1955), opposite another Australian, Errol Flynn, for Allied Artists.

He was much in demand. C.G. Scrimgeour of Associated TV wanted Finch to play a patrol officer in a film based on Colin Simpson's articles about Shangri-La Valley in New Guinea. The Rank organisation wanted him to star in a film directed by Hugh Stewart called The Flying Doctor.

=== Under contract to Rank and stardom ===
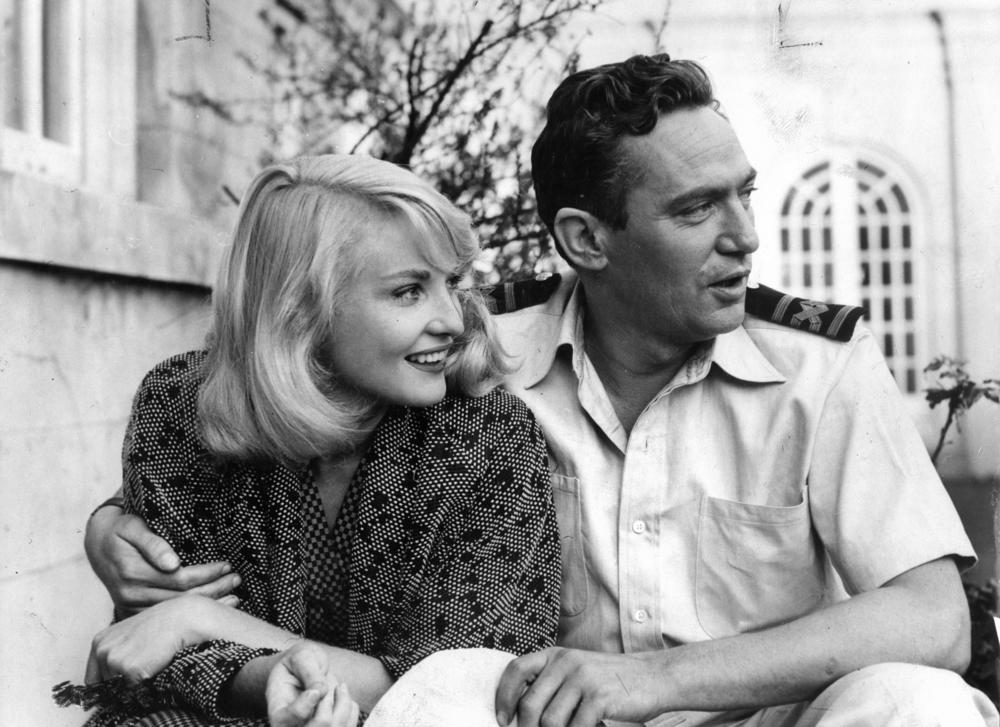
With Diane Cilento during filming of Passage Home (1955)

In November 1954 Finch's contract with Olivier (five years extended to six) had expired and he signed a seven-year contract with the Rank Organisation worth £87,500 to make one film a year for them. "We are going to build Peter into a major British star", said Earl St. John, Rank's head of production, at the time.

Finch's first roles for Rank under the new arrangement gave him star parts but were, on the whole, undistinguished: Passage Home (1955), a drama with Anthony Steel and fellow Australian Diane Cilento; Josephine and Men (1955), a comedy from the Boulting Brothers with Glynis Johns and Donald Sinden; and Simon and Laura (1955), a comedy with Kay Kendall based on a hit play. None of these films performed particularly well at the box office.

Finch was then cast as an Australian soldier in A Town Like Alice (1956), opposite Virginia McKenna under the direction of Jack Lee from the novel by Neville Shute. The World War II drama, mostly set in Malaya and almost entirely shot at Pinewood Studios, became the third-most-popular film at the British box office in 1956 and won Finch a BAFTA for Best Actor.

Finch followed it with another war movie, The Battle of the River Plate (1956), playing Captain Hans Langsdorff for the team of Powell and Pressburger. This was also hugely popular at home, and British exhibitors voted Finch the seventh-most-popular British star at the box office for 1956. In October 1956, John Davis, managing director of Rank, announced him as one of the actors under contract that Davis thought would become an international star.

Finch returned to Australia to make The Shiralee (1957), made for Ealing Studios and MGM from the novel by D'Arcy Niland, under the direction of Leslie Norman. It was one of Finch's favourite parts; the resulting movie was critically acclaimed and the tenth-most-popular movie at the British box office that year.

Finch followed it with another Australian story filmed on location, the bushranger tale Robbery Under Arms (1957), which did less well, despite having the same producer and director as A Town Like Alice. Filmink argued Finch's "character could be removed from the final movie, and it wouldn't have affected anything... a character with no romance, no moral core, no purpose in the story, no point." However, exhibitors still voted Finch the third-most-popular British star of 1957, and the fifth most popular overall, regardless of nationality.

Finch's next two films for Rank were not particularly successful: Windom's Way (1957), where he played a doctor caught up in the Malayan Emergency (the film was shot in Corsica and London); and Operation Amsterdam (1959), a war-time diamond thriller. Finch returned to the stage for the London production of Two for the Seesaw by William Gibson, under the direction of Arthur Penn.

== The Nun's Story and international stardom ==
Finch's career received a boost when Fred Zinnemann cast him opposite Audrey Hepburn in The Nun's Story (1959). This was an enormous financial and critical success and established Finch's reputation internationally. In August 1959 he said this and The Shiralee were the only two films he had done that he liked.

For Disney he played Alan Breck in a version of Kidnapped (1960) then went to Hollywood to make The Sins of Rachel Cade (shot in 1959, released in 1961), an attempt to repeat the success of The Nun's Story, with Angie Dickinson.

He was much in demand and still owed Rank three films under his contract. They wanted him to appear opposite Dirk Bogarde in The Singer Not the Song. Instead Finch decided to co-write and direct an award-winning short film, The Day (1960). He announced plans to direct a feature – Dig, about Australian exploration – but it did not eventuate.

Then, for a fee of £25,000 he played Oscar Wilde in The Trials of Oscar Wilde (1960), winning another BAFTA; the film, however, was not popular. He played a Labour politician in Rank's No Love for Johnnie (1961), and won his third BAFTA for Best Actor – although like Oscar Wilde, the film lost money. Finch's career was generally more successful away from Rank.

Finch was originally chosen to play Julius Caesar in Cleopatra (1963) opposite Elizabeth Taylor, and filmed some scenes in London, under the direction of Robert Mamoulian. When the film was postponed Finch withdrew; new director Joseph Mankiewicz wanted to still use him, but the actor was unable to make his schedule work, and the role was recast with Rex Harrison.

Finch made two unsuccessful Hollywood films with director Robert Stevens at MGM: I Thank a Fool (1962) and In the Cool of the Day (1963). While filming the latter he was reported in the Los Angeles Times as saying that the star system was dead and the future lay in independent films. He also said he would direct a second film The Hero.

Finch restored his critical reputation with two highly acclaimed British films: The Pumpkin Eater (1964) and Girl with Green Eyes (1964). He had an uncredited cameo in First Men in the Moon (1964), then had a good role in a tough adventure film for Robert Aldrich, The Flight of the Phoenix (1965).

Finch's next three films saw him support high-profile female stars: Sophia Loren in Judith (1966), Melina Mercouri in 10:30 P.M. Summer (1966) and Julie Christie in Far from the Madding Crowd (1967). He was reunited with Aldrich for The Legend of Lylah Clare (1968). The Red Tent (1970) was an expensive international adventure film, with Finch as Umberto Nobile.

== Later career ==
Finch's career received another boost when Ian Bannen dropped out of the lead in Sunday Bloody Sunday (1971). Finch replaced him and his performance was rewarded with another BAFTA for Best Actor and an Oscar nomination.

The momentum of this was lost somewhat by Something to Hide (1972) and the disastrous musical remake of Lost Horizon (1973). He played Lord Nelson in Bequest to the Nation (1973) and an opportunistic financier in England Made Me (1973). The Abdication (1974) was an unsuccessful historical drama.

Finch was asked to audition for the part of news presenter Howard Beale in Network (1976), written by Paddy Chayefsky and directed by Sidney Lumet. The movie, with Finch as its star, was his biggest commercial and critical hit in years. His line "I'm as mad as hell, and I'm not going to take this anymore!" has become iconic.

He then played Yitzhak Rabin in Raid on Entebbe (1977).

== Poet ==
Finch was also an occasional poet. He was encouraged by Kenneth Slessor, who published Finch's poem "Tell them" in Australian Poetry 1945, of which he was the editor. Slessor also arranged for a volume of Finch's early poems to be published. Finch's biographer Trader Faulkner reported that Finch told him that "no film award ... ever gave him the sense of fulfillment comparable to seeing a poem he'd written in print".

== Personal life ==
Finch was married three times. In 1943, he married Romanian-born French ballerina Tamara Tchinarova; they worked together on a number of films. They had a daughter, Anita, born in 1950. They divorced in 1959, after she discovered his affair with actress Vivien Leigh in California.

Finch then married South African-born actress Yolande Turner (née Yolande Eileen Turnbull); they had two children together, Samantha and Charles Peter. During their marriage, Finch had an affair with the singer Shirley Bassey. Bassey had a daughter, also named Samantha, born in 1963; Bassey's husband at the time, the openly gay film producer Kenneth Hume, believed that Finch was Samantha's biological father. Finch and Turner divorced in 1965.

On 9 November 1973 in Rome, Finch married Caribbean-born Mavis "Eletha" Barrett, who was known as Eletha Finch. They had a daughter together, Diana.

== Death ==
Shortly after Raid on Entebbe finished shooting, Finch undertook a promotional tour for Network. On 13 January 1977 he appeared on The Tonight Show Starring Johnny Carson. George Carlin was also on the show that night; he joked about death. The day after, Finch suffered a fatal heart attack in the lobby of the Beverly Hills Hotel with Network director Sidney Lumet at his side. He was 60 years old. Finch is interred in the Hollywood Forever Cemetery.

=== Posthumous Awards ===
On 29 Janury 1977, Finch was posthumously awarded the Golden Globe Award for Best Actor in a Motion Picture – Drama for Network. On 10 February 1977, Finch was nominated for the Academy Award for Best Actor. He joined James Dean (twice) and Spencer Tracy in being posthumously nominated for a Best Actor Oscar. On 29 March 1977, Finch became the first actor to win the award posthumously, as well as the first Australian actor to win a Best Actor award. He was the only posthumous winner of an Academy Award in an acting category until fellow Australian Heath Ledger won the Academy Award for Best Supporting Actor in 2009. Screenwriter Paddy Chayefsky went up on stage to accept the award as requested by the Oscar producers and director however, he said that there was no reason he should be there and asked if Finch's widow, Eletha, was in the theater as she was the one that Finch would have wanted to receive the award and she came on stage to accept. Finch also won the Best Actor award from the British Academy of Film and Television Arts (BAFTA) for Network. He had won the award four times previously.

Shortly before he died, Finch told a journalist:

We all say we're going to quit occasionally. I'd like to have been more adventurous in my career. But it's a fascinating and not ignoble profession. No one lives more lives than the actor. Movie making is like geometry and I hated maths. But this kind of jigsaw I relish. When I played Lord Nelson I worked the poop deck in his uniform. I got extraordinary shivers. Sometimes I felt like I was staring at my own coffin. I touched that character. There lies the madness. You can't fake it.

== Biographies ==
In 1954, the Australian journalist and author George Johnston wrote a well-researched series of biographical articles on Finch, his life, and his work, which appeared in the Sydney Sun-Herald on four consecutive Sundays, which were certainly the first detailed account of Finch's life to be published. Finch later provided the inspiration for the character Archie Calverton in Johnston's novel, Clean Straw for Nothing.

In 1980, American author Elaine Dundy published a biography of Finch titled Finch, Bloody Finch: A Biography of Peter Finch. That year, his second wife, Yolande Finch, also published a posthumous account of their life together, Finchy: My Life with Peter Finch. Another biography had previously been published by his friend and colleague Trader Faulkner, in 1979.

According to an entry in Brian McFarlane's The Encyclopedia of British Film, republished on the British Film Institute's Screenonline website, Finch "did not emerge unscathed from a life of well-publicised hell-raising, and several biographies chronicle the affairs and the booze, but a serious appraisal of a great actor remains to be written."

A profile of Finch at Screenonline asserts that "it is arguable that no other actor ever chalked up such a rewarding CV in British films."

== Awards and nominations ==
Institution	Year	Category	Film	Result
Academy Awards	1971	Best Actor	Sunday Bloody Sunday	Nominated
Academy Awards	1976	Best Actor	Network	Won (Posthumously)
BAFTA Awards	1956	Best British Actor	A Town Like Alice	Won
BAFTA Awards	1957	Best British Actor	Windom's Way	Nominated
BAFTA Awards	1959	Best British Actor	The Nun's Story	Nominated
BAFTA Awards	1960	Best British Actor	The Trials of Oscar Wilde	Won
BAFTA Awards	1961	Best British Actor	No Love for Johnnie	Won
BAFTA Awards	1971	Best Actor in a Leading Role	Sunday Bloody Sunday	Won
BAFTA Awards	1977	Best Actor in a Leading Role	Network	Won (Posthumously)
Berlin International Film Festival	1961	Best Actor	No Love for Johnnie	Won
Golden Globe Awards	1971	Best Actor in a Motion Picture – Drama	Sunday Bloody Sunday	Nominated
Golden Globe Awards	1976	Best Actor in a Motion Picture – Drama	Network	Won (Posthumously)
Moscow International Film Festival	1961	Best Actor	The Trials of Oscar Wilde	Won
National Board of Review	1967	Best Actor	Far from the Madding Crowd	Won
National Society of Film Critics	1971	Best Actor	Sunday Bloody Sunday	Won
New York Film Critics Circle	1971	Best Actor	Sunday Bloody Sunday	Nominated
Primetime Emmy Awards	1977	Outstanding Lead Actor in a Special Program – Drama or Comedy	Raid on Entebbe	Nominated (Posthumously)

== See also ==
- List of British actors
- List of Academy Award winners and nominees from Great Britain
- List of Academy Award winners and nominees from Australia
- List of posthumous Academy Award winners and nominees
- List of oldest and youngest Academy Award winners and nominees — Oldest winners for Best Lead Actor
- List of actors with Academy Award nominations
- List of actors with more than one Academy Award nomination in the acting categories
- List of Golden Globe winners

== Sources ==
- Dundy, Elaine (1980). Finch, Bloody Finch: A Biography of Peter Finch. New York: Holt, Rinehart & Winston. ISBN 978-0-03-041796-2.
- Faulkner, Trader (1979). Peter Finch: A Biography. London: Angus & Robertson. ISBN 978-0-207-95831-1.
- Finch, Yolande (1980). Finchy: My Life with Peter Finch. London: Arrow Books. ISBN 978-0-09-924190-4.
- Johnson, G., "The Success Story of Peter Finch", The Sun-Herald (Sydney) (Sunday, 8 August 1954), pp. 21–23
- Johnson, G., "The Long Road to London" (Sunday, 15 August 1954), pp. 23–25
- Johnson, G., "Dad and Dave, and then the War." The Sun-Herald (Sydney) 15 Aug 1954: 23
- Johnson, G., "The Thames is Non-Inflammable- But an Australian in London Leapt Up a Stairway To Stardom." The Sun-Herald (Sydney) 22 Aug 1954: 23
- Johnson, G., "The Threat and the Promise". The Sun-Herald (Sydney) 29 Aug 1954: 47
