= Charles Finch (British businessman) =

British businessman and film producer (born 1962)

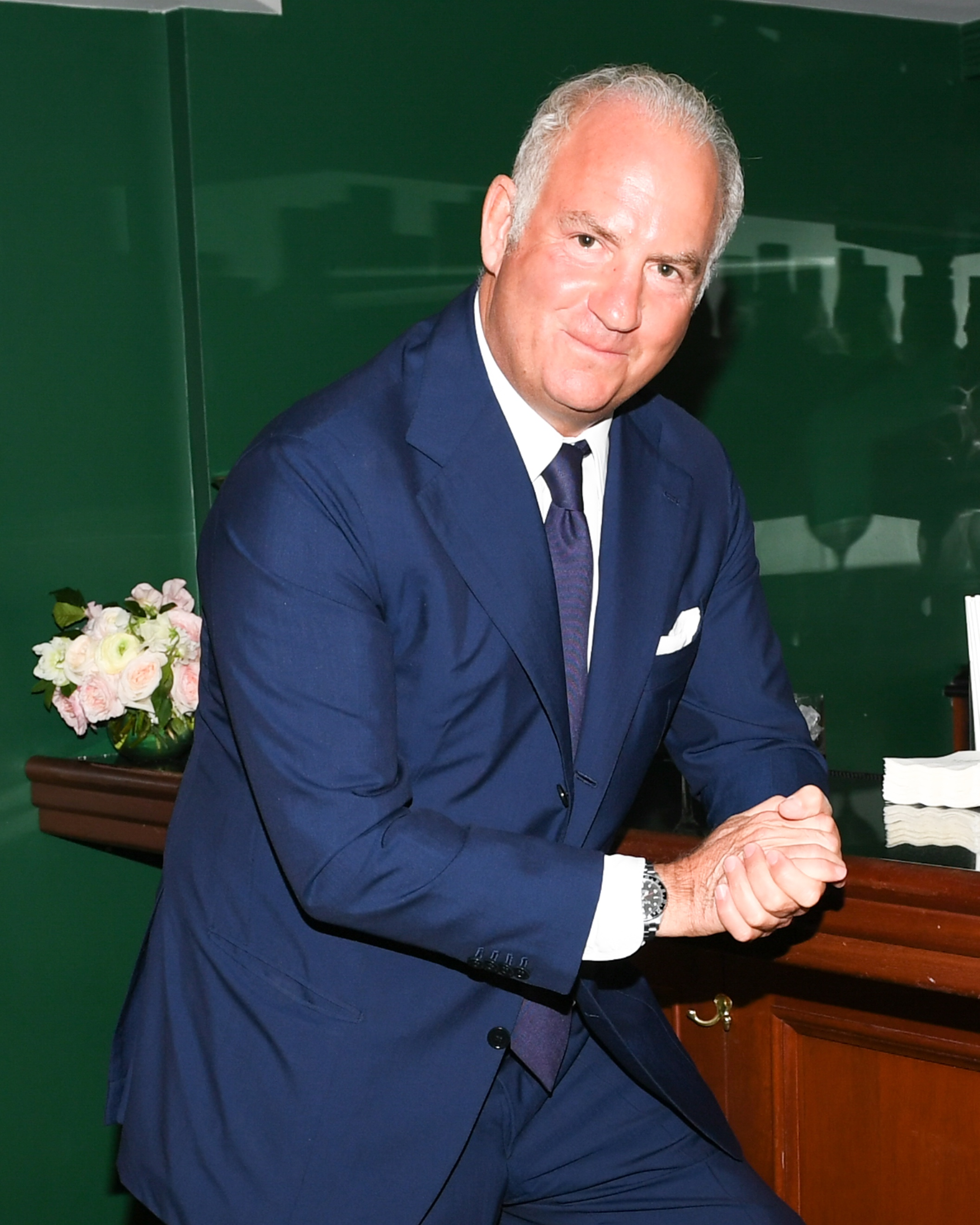
- Finch in 2021
- Born: Charles Peter George Thomas Ingle Finch; 15 August 1962 (age 63); London, England
- Citizenship: United Kingdom; South Africa
- Education: Gordonstoun
- Occupations: Businessman; Film producer
- Parents: Peter Finch (father); Yolande Turner (mother)
- Relatives: George Ingle Finch (grandfather)
- Website: charlesfinch.com

Charles P. Finch (born 15 August 1962) is a British businessman, film producer and publisher. Finch is the CEO of the brand development and investment company Finch + Partners and editor-in-chief of magazine A Rabbit's Foot.

== Early life and family ==
Finch is the son of the actor Peter Finch and grandson of the chemist and mountaineer George Finch. Finch was raised in Jamaica and France and schooled at Gordonstoun, in Scotland. His mother was the British-born South African actress and writer Yolande Turner nee Turnbull.

== Career ==
=== Film ===
Finch wrote and directed the 1988 fantasy film Priceless Beauty, and the 1991 thriller Where Sleeping Dogs Lie. He wrote, directed and acted in the 1998 film Never Ever. Films Finch has produced include Bad Girls (1994), which starred Andie MacDowell and Drew Barrymore and was co-written by his mother Yolande Turner; and Spider (2002), which starred Ralph Fiennes and was directed by David Cronenberg.

In 2008 Finch was executive producer on Battle for Haditha, a dramatisation of the Haditha massacre of 2005, in which 24 unarmed Iraqi men, women and children were killed by United States Marines. The film was directed by Nick Broomfield and aired on Channel 4. It was awarded the Grierson Award for Best Drama Documentary. In 2014, Finch was executive producer on Broomfield's Tales of the Grim Sleeper, which was shortlisted for the Academy Award for Best Documentary Feature.

=== Business ===
After a 10-year career of writing, directing and producing films, Finch became an agent at William Morris Agency in 1997. He was responsible for working with artists including Kevin Spacey, John Malkovich, Willem Dafoe, Cate Blanchett and Kristin Scott-Thomas, as well as corporate clients including Granada, BBC, Carlton, Pearson, and Channel 4.

In 2005, Finch left William Morris and founded Finch + Partners to connect his celebrity friends with branding and endorsement opportunities.

In 2011, Finch started a leisure and swimwear brand, Chucs Dive & Mountain Shop. Chucs Bar and Grill opened in August 2014 on Dover Street.

In 2024, Finch launched Équipement De Vie, a brand of shoes for sailing, which he co-founded with James Barshall.

=== Publishing ===
- In 2016, Finch released the book The Night Before BAFTA in 2016. Published by Assouline, the coffee table book focused on his annual pre-BAFTA party.
- In 2018, Finch established the Finch Publishing group.

== Filmography ==
=== Producer ===
- 1991 Where Sleeping Dogs Lie (co-producer)
- 1994 Bad Girls (producer)
- 1995 The Maddening (executive producer)
- 2001 Mike Bassett: England Manager (executive producer)
- 2002 Spider (executive producer)
- 2004 Fat Slags (producer)
- 2006 The Interrogation of Leo and Lisa (short) (executive producer)
- 2006 His Big White Shelf (television documentary) (executive producer)
- 2006 Ghosts (executive producer)
- 2007 Battle for Haditha (executive producer)
- 2007 Ruby Blue (executive producer)
- 2008 Camille (executive producer)
- 2013 The Smile Man (short) (executive producer)
- 2014 The Gift (short) (executive producer)
- 2014 Jump! (short) (executive producer)
- 2014 Tales of the Grim Sleeper (documentary) (executive producer)
- 2016 Going Going Gone: Nick Broomfield's Disappearing Britain (documentary television series) (executive producer – two episodes)
- 2017 Whitney: Can I Be Me (documentary) (executive producer)
- 2017 Love, Cecil (documentary) (executive producer)
- 2019 Marianne & Leonard - Nick Broomfield Documentary (executive producer)
- 2023 Priscilla - directed by Sofia Coppola (co-producer)

=== Writer ===
- 1988 Priceless Beauty
- 1991 Where Sleeping Dogs Lie
- 1994 Bad Girls (story)
- 1996 The Dentist
- 1996 Never Ever
- 1998 The Dentist 2

=== Actor ===
- 1986 Amazons (Timar)
- 1991 Where Sleeping Dogs Lie (Evan Best)
- 1995 French Exit (TV show host)
- 1996 Never Ever (Thomas Murray)

=== Appearance as self ===
- 2014 Annabel's: A String of Naked Lightbulbs (documentary)

=== Director ===
- 1988 Priceless Beauty
- 1991 Where Sleeping Dogs Lie
- 1996 Never Ever
