= Mystery Island (1937 film) =

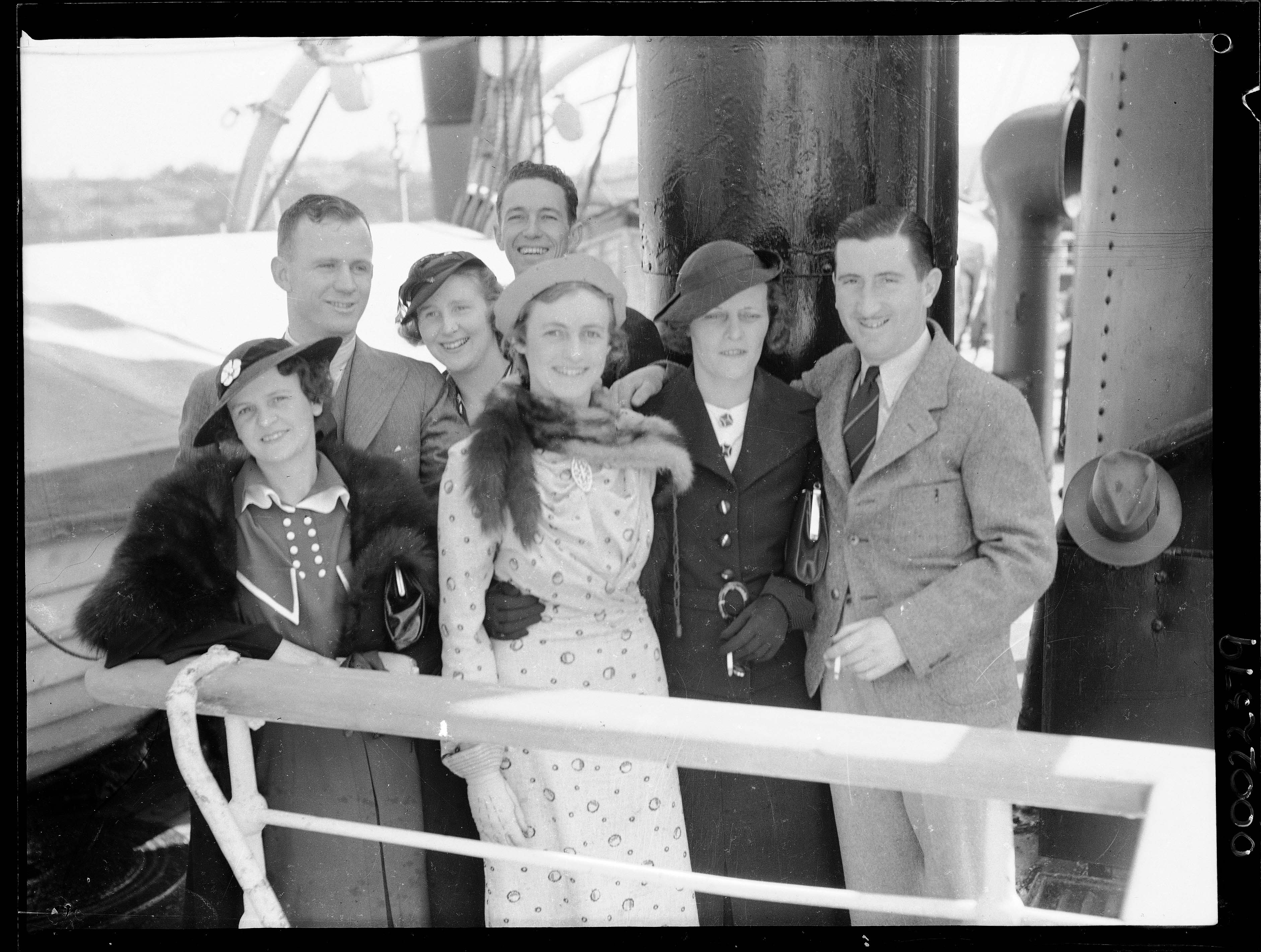
- Directed by: J.A. Lipman
- Written by: Harry Lauder
- Based on: story by Captain T. D. Bairnsfather
- Produced by: George D. Malcolm
- Starring: Brian Abbot; Jean Laidley
- Cinematography: George D. Malcolm
- Edited by: Arthur Hansen
- Music by: Rex Shaw
- Production company: Commonwealth Film Laboratories
- Distributed by: Paramount Pictures
- Release date: 6 March 1937
- Running time: 56 minutes (Australia)
- Country: Australia
- Language: English

Mystery Island is a 1937 Australian film shot almost entirely on location near Lord Howe Island. It is best remembered for the mysterious disappearance of two of its cast after filming completed.

== Plot ==
Two women and eight men are shipwrecked on a South Pacific island. There is a murderer amongst them. Only the murderer and the ship's captain know his identity but the captain has lost his memory.

== Cast ==
- Brian Abbot as Morris Carthew
- Jean Laidley as Audrey Challoner
- W. Lane-Bayliff as Captain Druce
- William Carroll as Chief Officer Vowels
- George Doran as Reverend Abel
- Edward Druitt as Seabright
- Desmond Hay (Leslie Hay-Simpson) as Packer
- Mollie Kerwin as Miss Fortescue
- Moncrieff Macallum as Green
- Douglas Mackinnon as Cook

== Production ==
The movie was mostly funded by Jack Bruce, who was the managing director of Commonwealth Film Laboratories.

It was shot almost entirely on one of the Admiralty Inlets near Lord Howe Island. A production unit of 20 sailed from Sydney in September 1936, taking £10,000 worth of equipment. Shooting went for a month and was marked by a number of difficulties, including constant rain, poor sound, and the loss of 2,000 feet (610 m) of exposed film which had to be reshot.

The female lead, Jean Laidley (real name Jean Mort), had experience in amateur theatre. She was a great-granddaughter of Thomas Sutcliffe Mort.

The unit returned to Sydney on 6 October. The shipwreck scene was completed in the studio of Commonwealth Film Laboratories in Sydney, being staged with models.

Early newspaper reports that the film was based on a story by Bruce Bairnsfather were scotched by his less famous brother, Captain T. D. Bairnsfather (died 18 April 1949), an employee of Sydney radio station 2KY, who claimed the credit (or took the blame). The screenplay was written by Harry Lauder, a nephew of Harry Lauder, the great Scottish comedian.

=== Disappearance ===
Actors Brian Abbot and Leslie Hay-Simpson elected to stay on the island for a few weeks after filming, intending to sail back to the mainland together in a 16-foot (4.9 m) open boat, called the Mystery Star, which Abbot brought over with him.

They left for Sydney on 6 October 1936 expecting to take 10–14 days. By 14 October a search had been launched. They were never heard of again.

== Reception ==
The film was released as a supporting feature. Reviews praised the scenery but were less fulsome about its dramatic qualities.

Brian Abbot's (real name George Rikard Bell) widow later sued his life assurance company for £1000, the amount payable on his death but refused by the company. The insurers' defence, led by Clive Evatt, KC, pointed out that the trip was a risky endeavor not disclosed to the insurers. The case was settled out of court.
