= Primitive Peoples =

- Directed by: George Heath
- Narrated by: Peter Finch
- Cinematography: George Heath
- Release date: 1949
- Country: Australia
- Language: English

Primitive Peoples is a 1949 three-part documentary about the people of Arnhem Land. It was narrated by Peter Finch who also worked as camera assistant during filming.
