= The Rats of Tobruk (film) =

- Directed by: Charles Chauvel
- Written by: Charles Chauvel; Elsa Chauvel; Maxwell Dunn (commentary)
- Produced by: Charles Chauvel; Charles Munro
- Starring: Grant Taylor; Peter Finch; Chips Rafferty; George Wallace
- Cinematography: George Heath
- Edited by: Gus Lowry
- Music by: Lindley Evans (musical direction); Charles Mackerras (associate); Willie Redstone (associate)
- Production company: Chamun Productions
- Distributed by: RKO (Australia); Umbrella Entertainment
- Release dates: 7 December 1944 (Australia); 1949 (UK); 1951 (US)
- Running time: 95 mins (Aust); 68 minutes
- Country: Australia
- Language: English

The Rats of Tobruk is a 1944 Australian film directed by Charles Chauvel. An abridged version was released in the United States in 1951 as The Fighting Rats of Tobruk. The film follows three drover friends who enlist in the Australian Army together during World War II. Their story is based on the siege of the Libyan city of Tobruk in North Africa by Rommel's Afrika Korps. The partly Australian defenders held the city for 250 days before being relieved by British forces.

== Plot ==
Three friends are droving cattle in Australia in 1939: the restless Bluey Donkin, easy-going Milo Trent and English writer Peter Linton, who is on a working holiday. Kate Carmody, a homesteader's daughter, is in love with Bluey, but she turned down his marriage proposal two years before because he is wild and restless and a womaniser, even though he admits he loves her too.

When war breaks out, the three men enlist in the Australian army and are assigned to the 9th Division. They ship out to Africa. After early successes against the poorly led Italians, the Commonwealth forces are driven back by Rommel, and the advancing Germans cut off and besiege Tobruk. In between attacks, the men have comic encounters with a barber, and Peter falls for a nurse, Sister Mary, after being wounded. There are several subsequent attacks in which all three soldiers are wounded. Linton is killed, but the others manage to repel the Germans. Bluey and Milo are then transferred to New Guinea, where Bluey is injured and a sniper kills Milo. Bluey kills the sniper and returns to Australia, where he is reunited with Kate.

== Cast ==
- Grant Taylor as Bluey Donkin
- Peter Finch as Peter Linton
- Chips Rafferty as Milo Trent
- Pauline Garrick as Kate Carmody
- Mary Gay as Sister Mary Ellis
- George Wallace as the barber of Tobruk
- Joe Valli as the Northumberland Fusilier
- John Sherwood
- Walter Pym
- Norman Blackler
- Gilbert Ellis
- Robert Carlyle
- Joe Anderson
- Toni Villa as a Japanese soldier
- Edward Esau as a British officer who falls asleep in a barber's chair

== Development ==
Chauvel made the film to follow his enormously popular Forty Thousand Horsemen (1940). Like that movie, it follows three friends overseas to war, starring Grant Taylor and Chips Rafferty.

In September 1941, Chauvel announced his follow-up movie would have the background of the wool industry. That seemed to change, and in November 1942, Chauvel announced plans to make a film about the Rats of Tobruk. He spent a year researching and writing, and securing government cooperation.

In July 1943, Variety reported Charles Munro would help finance two films of Chauvel, Rats of Tobruk and Fuzzy-wuzzies. (The latter would never be made.)

Financing was obtained from Hoyts, RKO-Radio, and Commonwealth Film Laboratories. The movie's production was even announced in The New York Times.

== Casting ==
In October 1943, it was announced that Grant Taylor, Peter Finch and Chips Rafferty would play the lead roles. They were all serving in the Australian army and played their parts on leave.

=== Mary Gay ===
19 year-old Terry Henderson was working as a clerk in the David Jones department store in Sydney, when she was 'discovered', by Chauvel, while participating in the "Young Stars of Tomorrow" talent quest on Sydney's radio station 2SM. Taking the professional name of "Mary Gay", she was cast as Sister Mary Ellis, the nurse who romances Peter Finch's character.

=== Four nurses ===
In March 1944, the Department of Information sent four members of the Australian Army Nursing Service at the 3rd Australian Women’s Hospital, based at the Thomas Walker Convalescent Hospital in West Concord, Sydney to appear in the film as nurses. The four were Captain Vera Frances Hamilton (NX70326), who had served in the Middle East, North Africa, the Netherlands East Indies, and in New Guinea, and had actually served as a nurse at Tobruk, Captain Lucy Alma Lewington (NX34691), who had served in the Middle East, Greece and New Guinea, Captain Agnes Riley Spence (NX34694), who had also served in the Middle East, Greece and New Guinea, and Lieutenant Katherine Constance Sturrock (née Neale) (NX76585), who had served in the Middle East. All four were involved in a hospital scene that was later cut from the film's final version. Only Vera Hamilton, who also took part in another hospital scene, appeared in the film's final version.

== Shooting ==
Shooting started in November 1943 with the first scenes shot at Cronulla Beach, standing in for the perimeter of Tobruk.

A set representing the town of Tobruk was constructed in a field near Camden. Underground firing posts and dugouts were reconstructed in the studio of Commonwealth Film Laboratories. The Cronulla sandhills stood in for the African desert, and battle scenes were shot at nighttime. Watsons Bay was used to shoot scenes of Australian soldiers embarking by boat.

The New Guinea sequences were shot at Lamington Plateau, near the crash site of the 1937 Stinson plane. (That wreck had been discovered by Bernard O'Reilly, who inspired Chauvel's later film, Sons of Matthew.) Army photographers also shot real-life footage in Papua for use in the movie. Filipino boxer Tony Villa plays the Japanese soldier who fights Grant Taylor at the end.

Captured German and Italian weaponry was used throughout filming. In 1943, the 3rd Army Tank Battalion was equipped with a squadron of Australian-built Sentinel AC1 tanks, which had been modified to resemble German tanks. The army provided advisers who had served in Tobruk.

Filming ended in June 1944.

== Reception ==
=== Critical ===
The film received mixed reviews. Variety called it "a disjointed piece that fails to hit the target... too much time is devoted to war sequences" The critic from the Argus thought it was better than Forty Thousand Horsemen, but the one from the Sydney Morning Herald claimed that:

The fictional background is dull and uninventive, the characterisation often stilted and self-consciously patterned to arbitrary types, and the editing loose and jumpy as the story, which, in its amateurish nature, is a dead weight on the entire production. The chief merits of the film, which was made in the face of great difficulties that may explain, but do not excuse, its weaknesses for a commercial market, are its reconstruction of Tobruk and the fidelity of its action scenes to historic fact. Yet, while these action scenes are truthful, their interpretation by the author leaves their outlines and purposes vague so that an audience has to guess too much about who's fighting whom and what the strategy is.

Filmink magazine later wrote, "Taylor looks puffier, more bald, less enthusiastic" than he did in Forty Thousand Horseman. "He’s still pretty good, just not as good as in Horseman – like the film itself, which was a commercial disappointment." The same magazine later argued the movie "is more a series of repetitive scenes and moments rather than a cohesive narrative" with "poorly integrated" comic moments. However the critic then called the film:

An invaluable time capsule of one of this country’s greatest feats of arms... The visual look, the brusque attitudes of the officers towards the men, the seriousness of the treatment; even the poignant moment where Wallace tells the three leads “well, I had a go didn’t I?” tell us much about Australia at the time. So too does the fight at the end of the movie between Grant Taylor and the Japanese soldier – it’s a vicious brawl and ends with Taylor shoving his opponent’s head under water and holding it there until the soldier drowns. It’s brutal, tough, and uncompromisingly depicted – a real insight into what your granddad (or great grandad) got up to in New Guinea’s Owen Stanley Range back in the day.

=== Box office ===
The early box office response was encouraging, but the movie was not as popular as Forty Thousand Horsemen.

In 1946 Variety reported the film "came in too late to mean much".

=== US release ===
It was not released in the US until 1951. The critic from The New York Times called the movie "one of the harrowing bores in years from anywhere... most of the eighty-five minutes is crawling agony... It's a toss-up as to which is more primeval, Mr Chauvel's direction or the acting of the entire cast."

== See also ==
- The Desert Rats
- Cinema of Australia
