= Charles E. Toberman =

American real estate developer (1880–1981)

Charles Edward Toberman
- Born: February 23, 1880; Seymour, Texas, U.S.
- Died: November 10, 1981 (aged 101); Hollywood, California, U.S.
- Resting place: Hollywood Forever Cemetery
- Occupation: Real estate developer
- Spouse: Josephine Washburn Bullock
- Children: 3

Charles Edward Toberman (February 23, 1880 – November 10, 1981) was a real estate developer and stenographer who developed landmarks in Hollywood, California, including the Hollywood Bowl, Grauman's Chinese Theatre, El Capitan Theatre, Roosevelt Hotel, Bank of America Building, Grauman's Egyptian Theatre and the Hollywood Masonic Temple. Toberman, along with H. J. Whitley has been called 'the Father of Hollywood'.

== Biography ==
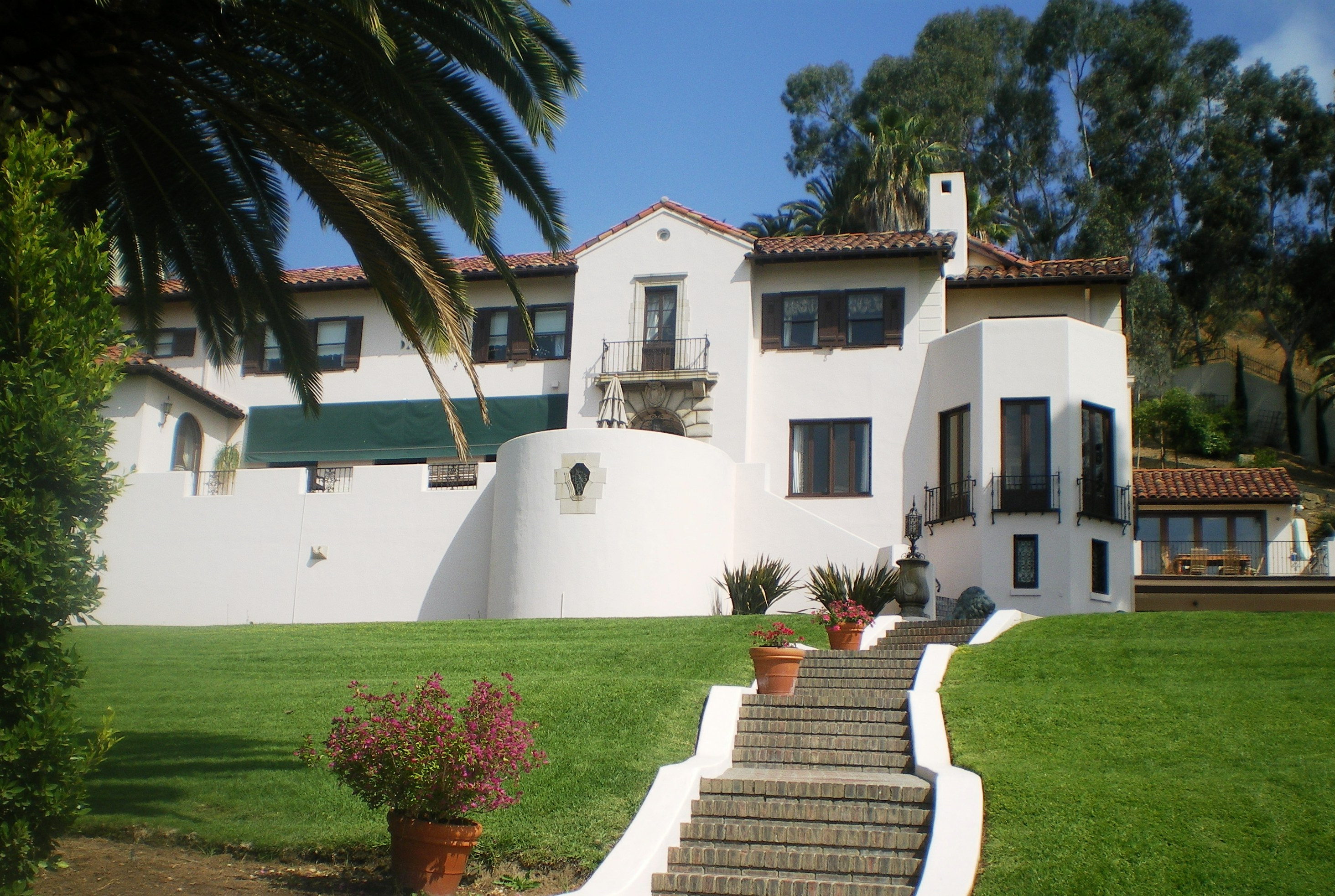
The Charles Toberman Estate — 1847 Camino Palmero, Hollywood, Los Angeles, California.

Toberman was born on February 23, 1880, in Seymour, Texas, to Philip and Lucy Ann Toberman; his uncle was Los Angeles mayor James R. Toberman. He attended the Agricultural and Mechanical College of Texas for three years and Metropolitan Business College at Dallas for one year.

Toberman began his career as a stenographer, working in Dallas and Wichita Falls, Texas, before moving to Los Angeles in 1902. He returned to Wichita Falls and ran a hardware store before returning to Los Angeles, where he held a variety of positions including City Treasurer of Hollywood. He worked in real estate from 1907 on, incorporating the C.E. Toberman Company in 1912. Mr. Toberman placed fifty-three Hollywood subdivisions on the market, formed more than thirty companies and organizations, built twenty-nine commercial buildings in Hollywood, including the world-famous Chinese Theater and was affiliated with forty-nine clubs, civic, and fraternal organizations up until retirement. Toberman managed all of his real estate holdings from his office in the heart of Hollywood. Throughout the 1910s and 1920s, Toberman developed many notable buildings and neighborhoods in Hollywood, including notable theatres with showman Sid Grauman. In 1924, he built a Spanish-style mansion known as the C.E. Toberman Estate. He co-founded the Black-Foxe Military Institute in 1928. He died in Hollywood of complications of a cerebral hemorrhage at age 101

According to a 1990 article in the Los Angeles Times, Toberman was known as "Mr. Hollywood" and the "Father of Hollywood" because of his development of the Hollywood Hills.

== Personal life ==
Toberman married Josephine Washburn Bullock on June 25, 1902. The couple had three children: Jeanette, Homer (died 1992), and Catherine. Charles Toberman died in November 1981.
