= These Stars Are Mine =

- Directed by: George Malcolm
- Starring: Peter Finch
- Cinematography: Harry Malcolm
- Production company: Commonwealth Film Unit
- Distributed by: National Films Council for the Department of Information; Warner Bros
- Release date: 1943
- Running time: 6 minutes
- Country: Australia
- Language: English

These Stars Are Mine is a 1943 Australian short film directed by George Malcolm and starring Peter Finch. It was a propaganda film for the war effort.

== Plot ==
George Reynolds, recently discharged from the army, tells his widowed father of his plans to marry Gwen and relax. His father tells him that if Australia is to avoid another postwar Depression, its citizens need to work hard towards a better future. George points to statues of Matthew Flinders, Arthur Philip and Sir Henry Parkes to inspire his son.

== Cast ==
- Wilfrid Thomas as John Reynolds
- Peter Finch as George Reynolds
- Patricia Firman as Gwen
