= El Capitan Theatre =

Movie theater in Los Angeles, California

- Hollywood Paramount Theatre; Loews Hollywood; Hollywood Cinema; Pacific's Paramount Theatre
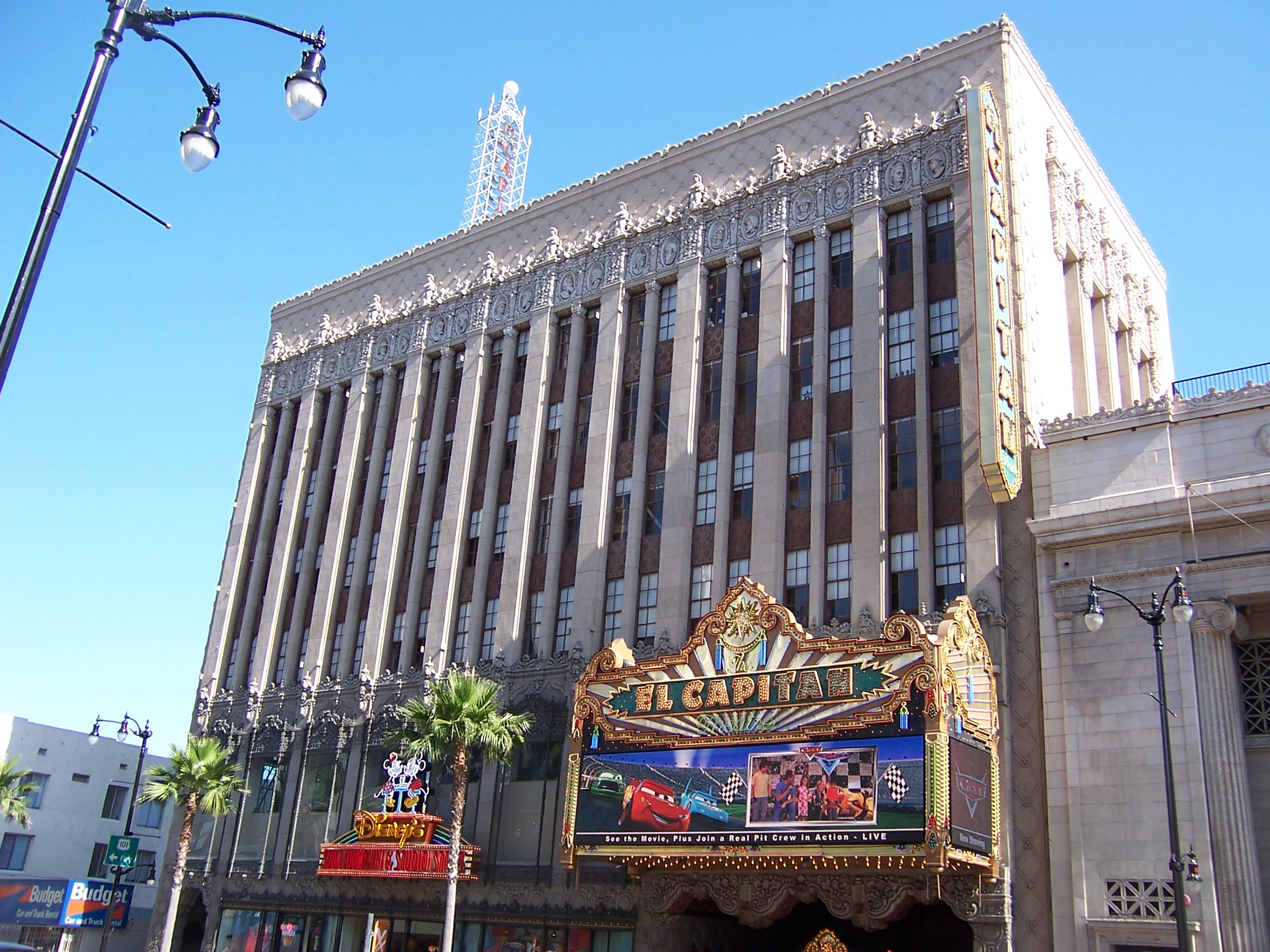
- El Capitan Theatre in 2006

- Location within Los Angeles County
- Address: 6838 Hollywood Boulevard; Los Angeles, California; 90028
- Coordinates: 34.101111°N 118.339722°W
- Owner: The Walt Disney Company
- Operator: Buena Vista Theatres, Inc.
- Capacity: 1,100
- Type: Movie palace
- Screen: 1
- Public transit: Hollywood/Highland

Construction
- Opened: May 3, 1926; 100 years ago
- Closed: 1941; 1989; 2020
- Reopened: 1942; 1991; 2021
- Architects: G. Albert Lansburgh; Stiles O. Clements
- Builder: Charles E. Toberman

Tenant
- Walt Disney Studios Motion Pictures

Website
- elcapitantheatre.com

Los Angeles Historic-Cultural Monument
- Designated: 1990
- Reference no.: 495

U.S. National Register of Historic Places
- Designated: April 4, 1985
- Part of: Hollywood Boulevard Commercial and Entertainment National Historic District
- Reference no.: 85000704

The El Capitan Theatre is a fully restored movie palace at 6838 Hollywood Boulevard in the Hollywood neighborhood in Los Angeles, California, United States. The theater and adjacent Hollywood Masonic Temple (now known as the El Capitan Entertainment Centre) are owned by the Walt Disney Company and serve as the venue for a majority of the Walt Disney Studios' film premieres.

== History ==
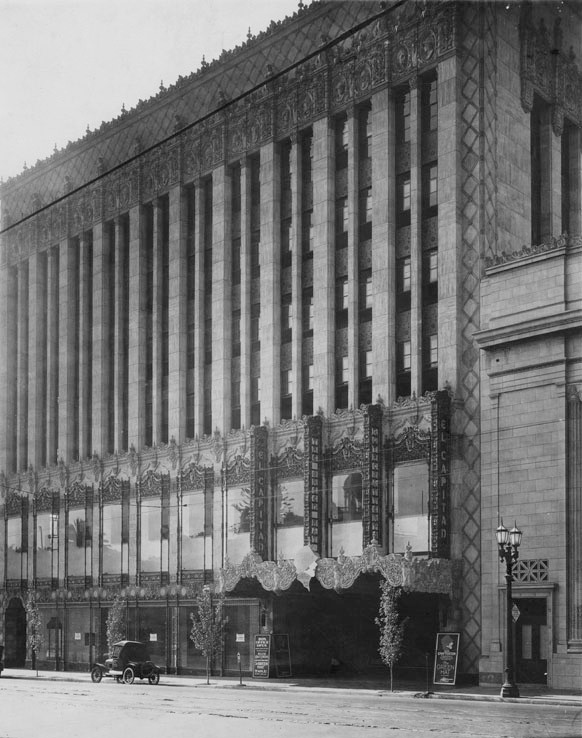
The theatre in 1926

=== El Capitan early years ===
In the early 1920s, real estate developer Charles E. Toberman (the "Father of Hollywood") envisioned a thriving Hollywood theater district. Toberman was involved in 36 projects while building the Max Factor Building (now the Hollywood Museum), Hollywood Roosevelt Hotel and the Hollywood Masonic Temple. With Sid Grauman, he opened the three themed theaters: Egyptian (1922), El Capitan (1926), and Chinese (1927).

Barker Bros. Furniture Emporium took up the rest of the building in the 1920s.

El Capitan, dubbed "Hollywood's First Home of Spoken Drama," began presenting live performances on May 3, 1926, with Charlot's Revue starring Gertrude Lawrence and Jack Buchanan. El Capitan continued presenting live theater for a decade, with over 120 productions including such legends as Clark Gable and Joan Fontaine.

By the late 1930s, El Capitan felt the economic effects of the Depression, showcasing fewer and fewer productions. This period saw a cycle of experimentation with entertainment. In an effort to boost attendance at the theater, its management attempted to lure revues, road shows and benefits.

Despite these efforts, business was faltering, and the theater then began showing movies. When Orson Welles was unable to locate a theater owner willing to risk screening Citizen Kane, he turned to the El Capitan, and in 1941, Citizen Kane had its world premiere there. The theater then closed for one year as Paramount Pictures purchased the theater.

=== Hollywood Paramount ===
The building was remodeled in the modern style, with the decor covered with curtains and removing the box-seat balconies. The theater reopened in 1942 as the Hollywood Paramount Theater. Its inaugural film presentation was Cecil B. DeMille's feature Reap the Wild Wind.

The theater remained the West Coast flagship for Paramount Pictures until the studio was forced by the U.S. Supreme Court's decision in the antitrust case U.S. vs. Paramount Pictures, et al. to divest itself of its theater holdings. After this, the Hollywood Paramount was operated by United Paramount Theatres for some years, then by a series of other companies, culminating with ownership by the Pacific Theatres Circuit in the 1980s.

After a 50-year stay, Barker Bros. Furniture closed its location in the building in the 1970s. In 1985, Pacific Theatres purchased the theater from SRO Theaters. The building's owners, Nick Olaerts and Thomas L. Harnsberger, had assigned authority for the theater's facade to the Los Angeles Conservancy in exchange for historical building tax credits.

=== Disney and restoration ===
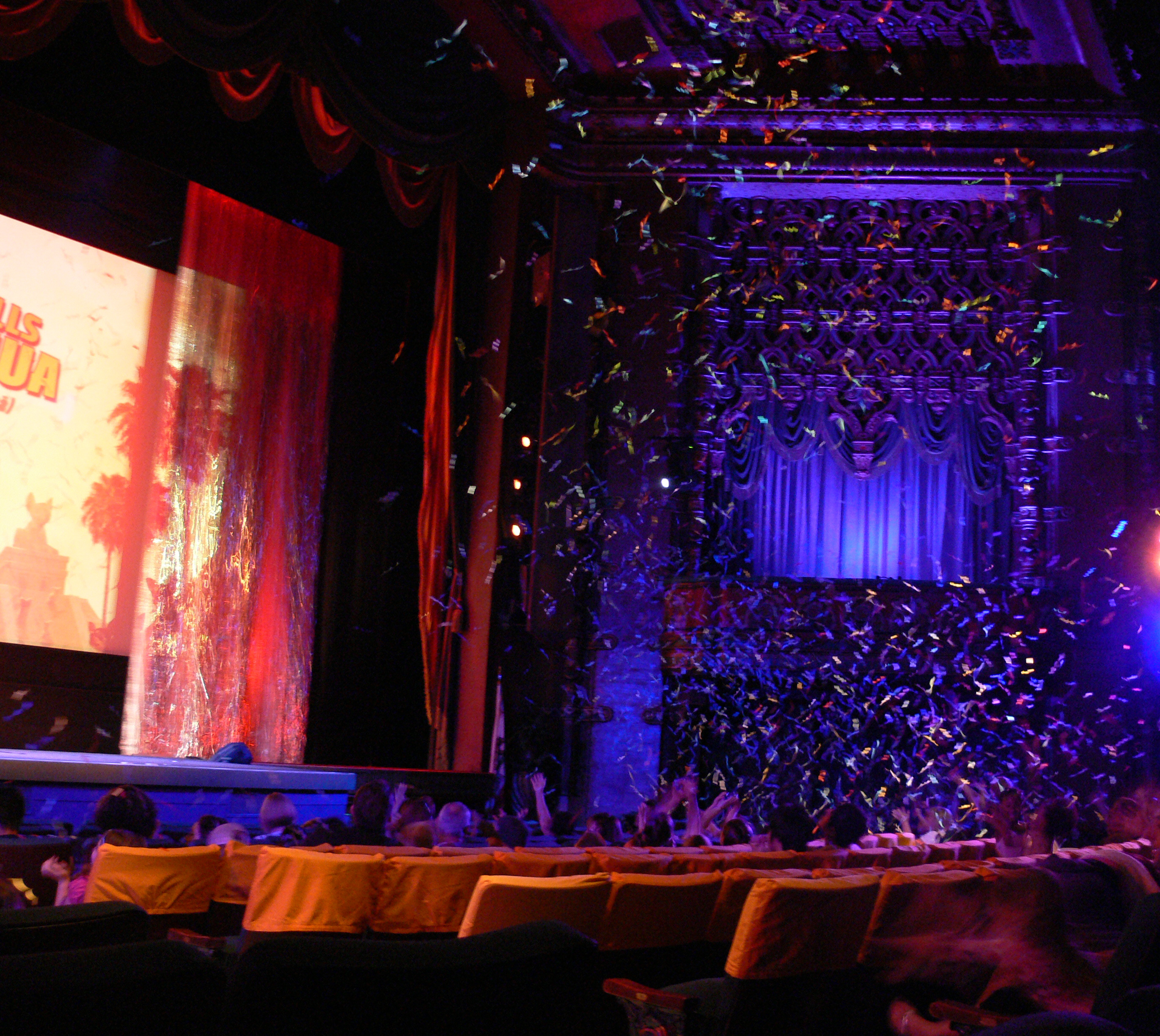
Confetti rains at the end of a show, 2008

Late in the 1980s, Disney purchased a controlling stake in one of Pacific Theatres' chains, leading to Disney's Buena Vista Theaters and Pacific renovating the El Capitan Theatre and the Crest by 1989. These theaters became Disney's flagship houses. They spent $14 million ($36.4 million in 2025) on a complete renovation of the Paramount, restoring much of the building's original decor as well as the theater's original name. El Capitan reopened in 1991 with the premiere of The Rocketeer. The 1992 National Preservation Honor Award from the National Trust for Historic Preservation was bestowed on the restorers of the theater.

In 1985, the Hollywood Boulevard Commercial and Entertainment District was added to the National Register of Historic Places, with El Capitan/Paramount listed as a contributing property in the district, and in 1990, the city designated El Capitan a Los Angeles Cultural-Historic Monument.

A Michael Jackson mural was approved by the National Park Service to be placed on the side of the building in December 1992.

After the 1994 Northridge earthquake, the building's frame was compromised and the theater had been flooded by its sprinklers and was considered uninhabitable by building inspectors. The owner walked away from the theater leaving the building to its mortgage company, CUNA Mutual Group. CUNA Mutual, having Disney as a continuing tenant, not only refurbished the theater but the office floors above for $10 million ($21.7 million in 2025). In July 1995, Buena Vista purchased the Lanterman organ from Glendale City Redevelopment Agency.

From the November 18, 1995, Toy Story premiere to January 1, 1996, Disney rented the Masonic Convention Hall, the next-door building, for Totally Toy Story, an instant theme park and a promotional event for the movie. In July 1998, Buena Vista Pictures Distribution purchased the convention hall to continue using it as a promotional venue. A Disney Store location opened next to the theater in the El Capitan Building in 1998.

The $3 million ($6.16 million in 2025) seismic retrofitting was finished in time for the June 21, 1996, premiere of The Hunchback of Notre Dame. The building's full restoration was completed in December 1997, which included the sign tower. The Hollywood Entertainment District, a self-taxing business improvement district, was formed for the properties from La Brea Avenue to McCadden Place on Hollywood Boulevard. The office space's first tenants were TrizecHahn Centers, builders of the 425,000-square-foot development on the other side of the boulevard. In conjunction with the Herbie: Fully Loaded premiere on June 22, 2005, the Disney's Soda Fountain and Studio Store opened up in the El Capitan Building on the ground floor replacing a Disney Store.

CUNA Mutual, having leased the building to full capacity, placed the building up for sale in 2008 at a price of $31 million, and eventually sold it for $28 million ($41.9 million in 2025).

In November 2013, Ghirardelli Soda Fountain and Chocolate Shop co-located with the Disney Studio Store next to the theater in the El Capitan building.

On March 17, 2020, the theatre temporarily closed due to the COVID-19 pandemic in California. The theatre eventually reopened a year later with a reduced capacity of just 100 seats. The first film shown after its reopening was Raya and the Last Dragon.

Disney Parks opened a theme ride called Mickey & Minnie's Runaway Railway at Disneyland on January 27, 2023. The facade is meant to resemble a movie theater in Toontown called "El CapiTOON Theater" based on the El Capitan.

== Features ==
The theater is built into a six-story office building built in the 1920s. The design featured a mixed interior by G. Albert Lansburgh. The interior is a lavish East Indian in the main auditorium, English Tudor in the wood-paneled lower lobby and Italian Baroque on the facade.

The refurbished theater features a large Wurlitzer theatre organ originally installed in San Francisco's Fox Theatre in 1929. Next door is the adjacent Disney's Soda Fountain and Studio Store, where patrons can purchase ice cream themed to the film currently playing in the cinema next door. A wide variety of Disney and movie merchandise is available there.

Marquee, 2005

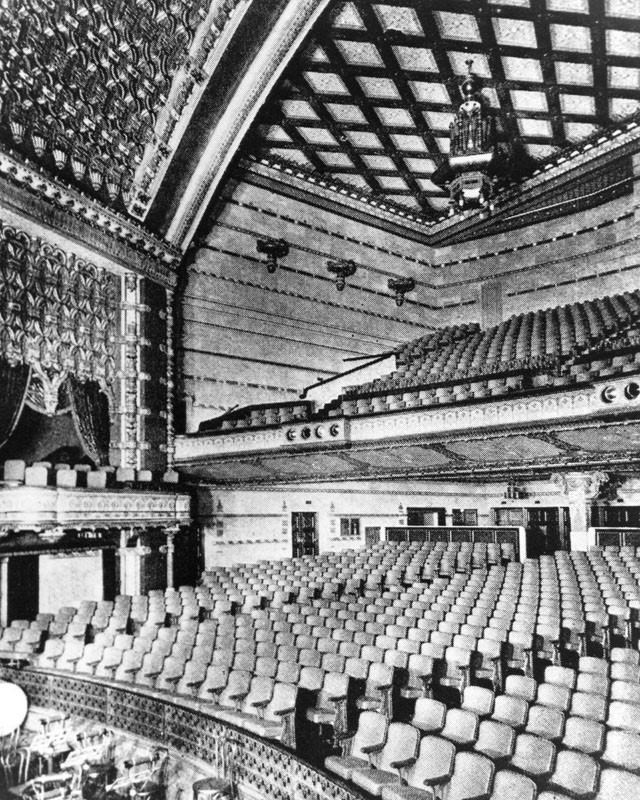
Interior, 1926

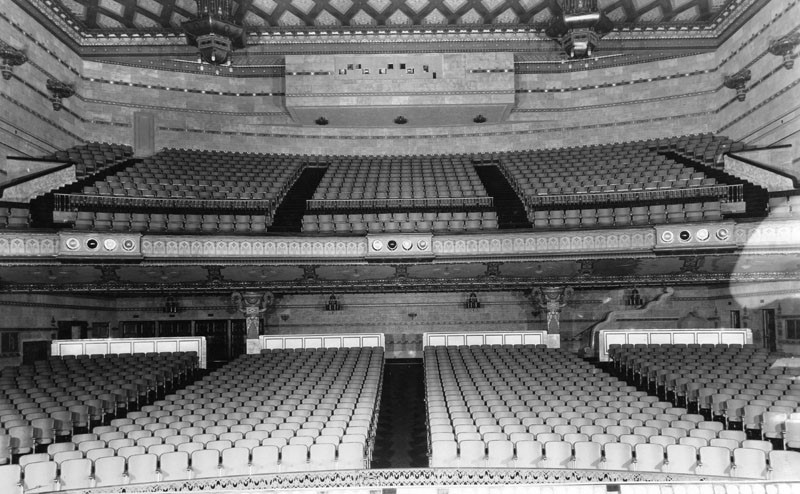
Seating, 1926

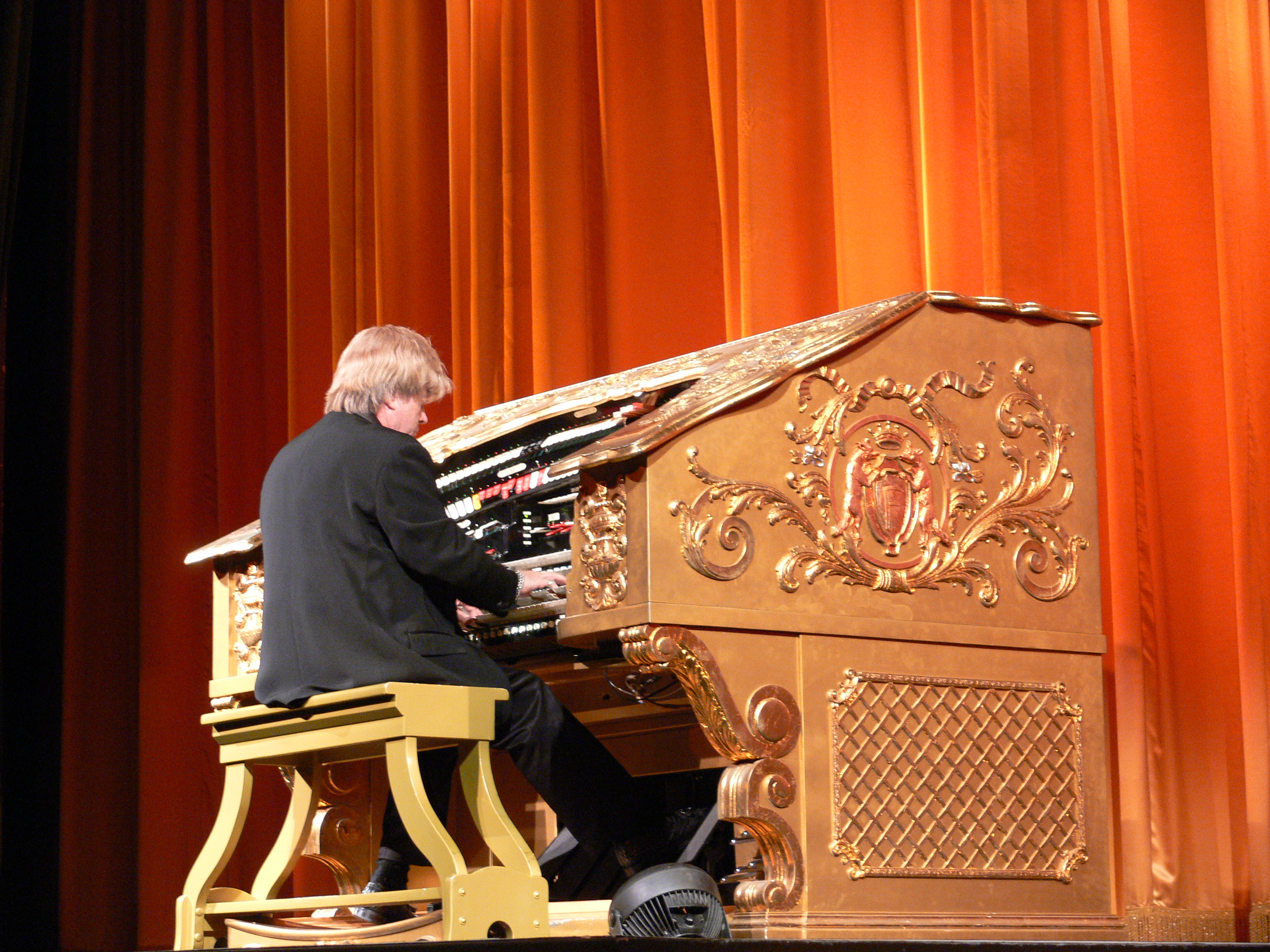
Organ, 2009

== See also ==
- List of Los Angeles Historic-Cultural Monuments in Hollywood
- List of contributing properties in the Hollywood Boulevard Commercial and Entertainment District
- Hollywood Masonic Temple (1921)
- Grauman's Egyptian Theatre (1922)
- Grauman's Chinese Theatre (1927)
