= C.E. Toberman Estate =

Historic house in California, United States

- Toberman, C. E., Estate
- U.S. National Register of Historic Places
- Los Angeles Historic-Cultural Monument
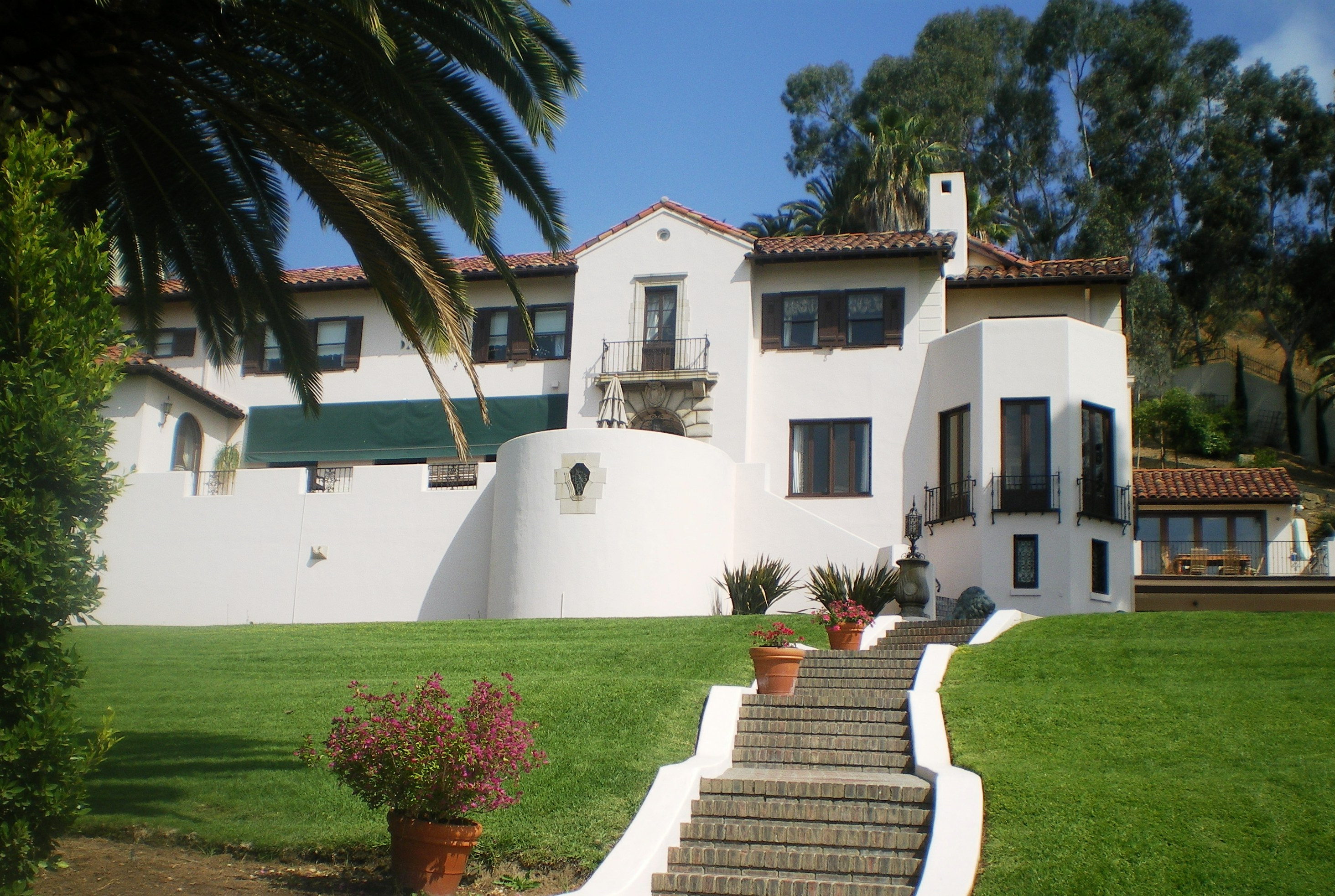
- Charles Toberman Estate, 2008

- Location within the Los Angeles metropolitan area Location within California Location within the United States
- Location: 1847 Camino Palmero St, Los Angeles, California
- Coordinates: 34°6′17.64″N 118°21′1.08″W
- Built: 1926
- Architect: Russell & Alpaugh
- Architectural style: Mission Revival-Spanish Colonial Revival
- NRHP reference No.: 83001205
- LAHCM No.: 285

Significant dates
- Added to NRHP: September 15, 1983
- Designated LAHCM: October 3, 1984

The C. E. Toberman Estate, also known as Villa Las Colinas, is a gated Mission Revival mansion and estate on Camino Palmero in Hollywood, Los Angeles, California. It was listed on the National Register of Historic Places in 1983, and as a Los Angeles Historic-Cultural Monument in 1984.

== Architecture ==
In 1922, C. E. Toberman hired architects Russell & Alpaugh to design his Mission Revival and Spanish Colonial Revival style dream house, which took two years to build and was completed in 1924. The estate, built on a 2-acre (8,100 m^{2}) lot, includes a 19-room, 9,800-square-foot (910 m^{2}) main house, a 1,809-square-foot (168.1 m^{2}) guest apartment and garage, and a separate natatorium with a 30 by 50-foot (15 m) tiled pool with cabanas under skylights. The main house has eight fireplaces, a butler's pantry and cut-crystal doorknobs. Toberman, who lived to be 101 years old, recalled in a 1981 interview that the estate became "practically a country club" with its enclosed swimming pool, tennis courts, a nine-hole pitch-and-putt golf course, and formal gardens.

== History ==
The house was built for Charles E. Toberman (1880–1981), a noted real estate developer who was known as "Mr. Hollywood" and the "Father of Hollywood" for his role in developing Hollywood and many of its landmarks, including the Hollywood Bowl, Grauman's Chinese Theatre, the Roosevelt Hotel, the Grauman's Egyptian Theatre and the Hollywood Masonic Temple.

The house was reportedly featured in the first issue of Architectural Digest with a young Bette Davis at the front door. The Toberman family lived at the estate until 1941. It was situated on one of the most exclusive streets in Hollywood, adjacent to the Errol Flynn estate and with neighbors including Bette Davis, Samuel Goldwyn, Preston Sturges, Al Jolson, Ozzie and Harriet Nelson and Fatty Arbuckle.

In 1980, the Toberman estate sold for $1 million (then a record price for a house in the Los Colinos section of Hollywood), and it was listed for sale in 1982 at a price of $1.5 million. The estate was placed on the National Register of Historic Places in 1983, after the property was purchased and renovated by Beverly Hills attorney and investor Donald L. Hunt. In the 1980s the house was recommended for Historic-Cultural Monument status by the Los Angeles Cultural Heritage Commission, but the proposal was initially rejected by the City Council because "the property owner and the councilman of the district object." The estate was later designated as Historic Cultural Monument #285.

=== Filming location ===
The Toberman Estate has long been a popular filming location. In 1990, it was the principal filming location for the film Where Sleeping Dogs Lie. The Toberman Estate was also used as the home of Vincent Chase on the first two seasons of HBO's Entourage and the later sixth season.

The estate was later renamed "Villa Las Colinas" and is rented for receptions and special events.

=== August 2009 Fire ===
On the morning of August 30, 2009, a fire broke out in the kitchen of the main house. The Los Angeles Fire Department responded at 8:29 AM with 130 firefighters. The flames spread to the attic, and it took just over two hours for it to be extinguished. Two firefighters received minor injuries and were taken to local hospitals.

== See also ==
- List of Los Angeles Historic-Cultural Monuments in Hollywood
- List of Registered Historic Places in Los Angeles
