= Austral Groves Wilson =

Australian soprano (1894–1989)

Austral Groves (Strella) Wilson OBE
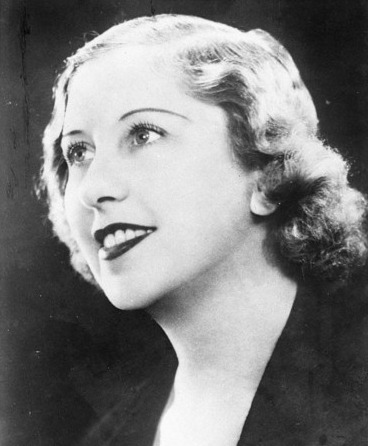
- Studio portrait of Austral Groves Wilson
- Born: Austral Groves Wilson; 19 December 1894; Broken Hill, New South Wales, Australia
- Died: 10 February 1989 (aged 95); Darlinghurst, New South Wales, Australia
- Other name: Strella Wilson
- Education: Church of England Girls' Grammar School, Melbourne Albert Street Conservatorium
- Occupations: Opera singer; Radio personality
- Spouse: Ralph Errolle (1920-1926)
- Children: 2
- Parent: Harry Wilson Carpenter (father) Anne Skewes (mother)
- Honours: OBE

Austral Groves "Strella" Wilson OBE (19 December 1894 – 10 February 1989) was an Australian soprano, World War II troop entertainer, and radio personality. She was not only a favorite in Australia, but also performed in North America, England, Hong Kong and Japan. She was appointed Order of the British Empire in 1950.

== Early life ==
Wilson was born on 19 December 1894 in Broken Hill, New South Wales and grew up in Melbourne. Her father was Harry Wilson Carpenter, a mining engineer from America, and her mother was Anne née Skewes from South Australia. She was the second of five children. The name 'Austral' was given to her by her godparents. This was often shortened to 'Aussie', so her parents gave her the nickname 'Strella' which made her full title resemble 'Australia'. Wilson was educated at Church of England Girls' Grammar School in Melbourne from 1907 to 1910.

Wilson's mother was an amateur singer and was a formative influence on the artist. Wilson was later taught singing by Agnes Janson before studying at the Albert Street Conservatorium in 1915 under Nellie Melba. She studied there for two and a half years.

== Career ==
In 1919, Wilson made her first professional performance in Melbourne as Leonora in Il trovatore with Fred Rigo's Grand Opera Company. She then sang with the J. C. Williamson Grand Opera Company in roles including Micaela in Carmen . Whilst with the Company, she met American tenor Ralph Errolle, whom she married on 21 September 1920. In 1922, Errolle and Wilson moved to the United States. Whilst there, she did concert work in New York City and Chicago, and became known as "the silver voice from Australia's silver city". In New York she studied with Yeatman Griffith and learned about voice production and acting by attending rehearsals of operas. In Chicago, she studied with Rosa Raisa. Whilst in America she regularly broadcast for the W.J.Z. network. Wilson also performed with the De Feo Opera Company in Canada.

Wilson and Errolle divorced in 1926. She returned to Australia in 1926 with her two daughters (one of whom became Pauline Garrick), and became a regular performer in the works of Gilbert and Sullivan and for J. C. Williamson's. In the early 1930s she moved to England and made her English debut in pantomime in Manchester. She also performed at the Covent Garden Opera House and at the Drury Lane Theatre. At Drury Lane she played Princess Mirabelle in Cavalcade, which was a role written especially for her by Noël Coward. Wilson returned to Australia again in 1934 in order to start in J. C. William's production of White Horse Inn, which was the opening production in the then new His Majesty's Theatre, Melbourne.

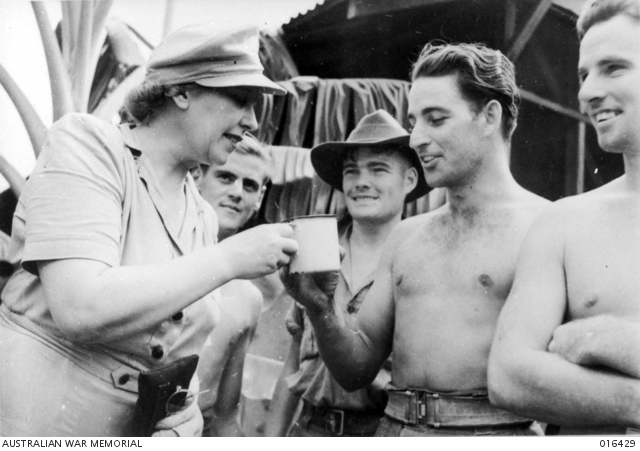
Miss Strella Wilson is offered a mug of tea after her arrival in New Guinea.

In the 1930s and 1940s, Wilson was a radio performer with the Australian Broadcasting Company and on commercial radio working with Jack Davey. During and shortly after World War II, she was a troop entertainer touring the Northern Territory, New Guinea, and gave 104 performances in Hong Kong and Japan. In 1950, she was awarded an O.B.E. in recognition for this work.

Wilson retired from performing in 1951 and subsequently worked as a hostess at Australia house in London until 1968. She moved back to Australia where she lived in Elizabeth Bay, New South Wales. She received a life membership from the Australian Music Association in 1973 in recognition of her services to music.

== Personal life ==
Wilson enjoyed horse riding and tennis. She had two daughters, Pauline Garrick (who became a singer in her own right) and Marjorie Anne.
