= Never Ever (1996 film) =

- Directed by: Charles Finch
- Written by: Charles Finch
- Produced by: Mark Amin
- Starring: Sandrine Bonnaire; Jane March; Charles Finch; James Fox; Jean Rochefort; Julian Sands
- Cinematography: Monty Rowan
- Edited by: Chris Joyce
- Music by: Peter John Vettese
- Distributed by: Trimark
- Release dates: 13 September 1996 (TIFF); 10 February 1998 (video)
- Running time: 110 minutes
- Countries: United States; United Kingdom
- Languages: English; French

Never Ever is a 1998 independent film written and directed by Charles Finch, and starring Finch, Sandrine Bonnaire, and Jane March. It premiered at the Toronto International Film Festival on 13 September 1996 and was later released to video on 10 February 1998.

== Plot ==
Thomas and Amanda Murray, a British couple, move to Paris where Thomas gets a job working at a bank owned by Amanda's father, Arthur. Amanda does not like Paris, and returns home to London. On a country drive, Thomas meets up with a French woman named Katherine and begins an affair with her. When Amanda discovers the affair, she attempts suicide. Arthur begs Thomas to drop Katherine, reconcile with Amanda and fly off with her to Hong Kong, where another job awaits him.

== Cast ==
- Sandrine Bonnaire as Katherine Beaufort
- Jane March as Amanda Murray
- Charles Finch as Thomas Murray
- James Fox as Arthur Trevane
- Jean Rochefort as Gerard Panier
- Julian Sands as Roderick

== Critical reception ==
The film received negative reviews. Variety described it as "an embarrassingly klutzy romantic drama" but said "Bonnaire brings light and flavor to her role and scenes, and handles her dialogue as best as possible, but she's basically paddling upstream".
