= Pauline Garrick =

Australian actress (1921–2001)

Pauline Austral Garrick (3 July 1921 – 13 July 2001), known as "Polly", was an Australian singer and actress, best known for her numerous singing appearances and playing the female lead in The Rats of Tobruk (1944).

== Family ==
- Photographs
- Pauline Garrick ("Miss Sydney") with Lieutenant K.C. Sturrock, of the Australian Army Nursing Service, who Garrick had worked with on the The Rats of Tobruk (9 September 1944). Collection of the Australian War Memorial.
- Pauline Garrick and pianist Mamie Read, at Lae, Morobe Province, New Guinea (28 January 1945). Collection of the Australian War Memorial.
- Pauline Garrick and pianist Mamie Read, at Lae, Morobe Province, New Guinea (28 January 1945). Collection of the Australian War Memorial.
- Pauline Garrick, comedian Dick Bentley, and pianist Mamie Read, at Aitape, New Guinea (20 February 1945). Collection of the Australian War Memorial.
- Pauline Garrick and Dick Bentley singing duet, accompanied by pianist Mamie Read, at Aitape, New Guinea (20 February 1945). Collection of the Australian War Memorial.
- Pianist Mamie Read, Pauline Garrick, and comedian Dick Bentley, at Bouganville (2 March 1945). Collection of the Australian War Memorial.

The daughter of the famed singer Austral Groves Wilson (1895-1989), known professionally as Strella Wilson, and her husband, the American tenor, Ralph Errolle Smith (1890-1973), known professionally as Ralph Errolle, Pauline Austral Smith (NSW. birth reg. no.33946/1921) was born at Mosman, Sydney, on 3 July 1921. Her sister, Marjorie Anne (1922-2012), later Mrs. Leslie Victor Wolf, was born in Long Island, New York, USA.

Pauline married Derek Herbert Cyril "Mick" Lloyd (1921-1969), at St Mark's Church, Darling Point, the son of Major-General Herbert William Lloyd (1883-1957) on 3 October 1945. Their daughter, Jennifer Anne, was born at Darlinghurst on 7 September 1946; who, in 1967, already a 6-foot tall water skiing champion, emerged as the pop singer Samantha with her release of the single "Vamp" on the W&G label. Their son was born at Darlinghurst on 2 January 1950.

== Career ==
She changed her name to "Garrick" so as not to be confused with her mother. Pauline was one of the most popular singers in Australia in the 1940s. She performed for Australian troops during World War Two.

Garrick retired briefly to get married and have a child but then returned to singing in 1948. She regularly performed in operas and musicals.

== "Miss Sydney" ==
The Liquor Trades representative, Garrick, who had raised £100,921/17/7, and polled 24,221,251 votes, was crowned Miss Sydney in 1944.

== Death ==
Garrick died on 13 July 2001.

== Select credits ==
- Out of the Bag (1941) - radio
- The Cingalee (1942) - radio musical
- Rats of Tobruk (1944) - film
