= Sons of the Anzacs =

- Written by: Oliver Howes
- Produced by: Frank Bagnall
- Narrated by: Peter Finch; Chester Wilmot; Damien Parer
- Cinematography: Frank Hurley; Damien Parer
- Production company: Commonwealth Film Unit
- Release date: 1945
- Running time: 125 minutes
- Country: Australia
- Language: English

Sons of the Anzacs is a 1945 Australian documentary about the exploits of Australian soldiers during World War II. It covered nine campaigns up until the fall of Lae. It was later re-made and updated, in 1968, to cover the entire war.

== See also ==
- Salamaua–Lae campaign
