= Brian Abbot =

Australian actor (born 1911)

- Born: George Rikard Bell; 1911
- Disappeared: October 1936
- Occupation: Actor

George Rikard Bell (born 1911, disappeared October 1936), better known by the stage name Brian Abbot, was an Australian actor best known for playing the male lead in Orphan of the Wilderness (1936) and the circumstances of his death.

== Biography ==
George Rikard Bell (known professionally as Brian Abbot) ran away from school at aged 15 and worked as a jackeroo. He had a great love of sailing and originally wanted to be a sailor for a career, but worked on two vessels which later sunk, TSS Kanowna and SS Christina Frazer. In the words of a later newspaper profile, "As Mr. Abbot didn't believe in for the third time to prove that fate was against him he promptly decided that there were other adventurous jobs to be had which didn't carry the risk of drowning." He subsequently turned to acting, taking the stage name of Brian Abbot.

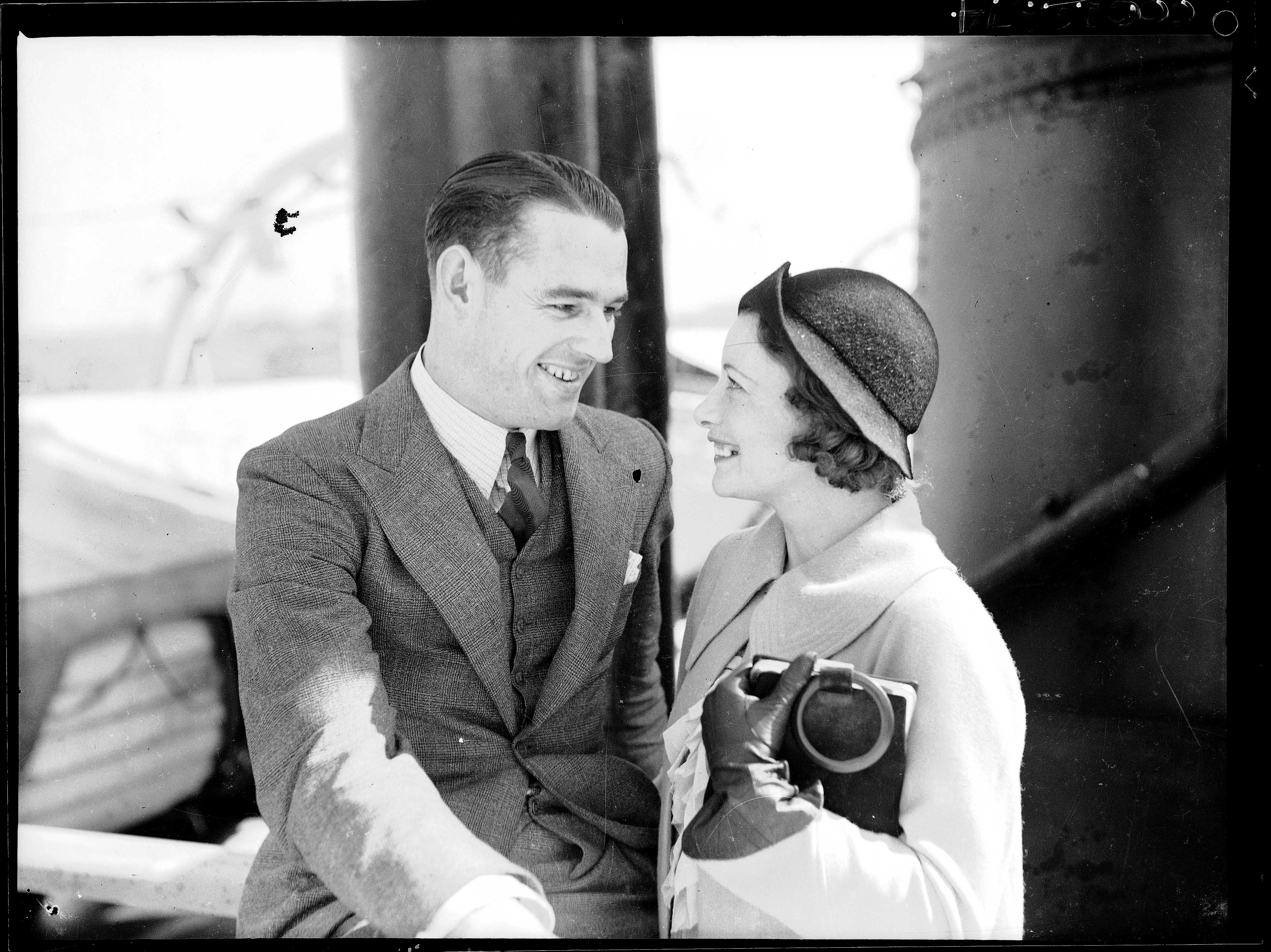
Brian Abbot with his wife Grace Rikard Bell

In early 1930 in Katoomba, he married Phyllis Curley and in September they had a son, Hal Beaumont Rikard Bell, named after his father, Harry (Hal). The October 1929 Wall Street crash reverberated around the world and Australia's unemployed rose from 10 percent in 1929 to 21 percent by the mid-1930s and by 1932 more than 31 percent of the Australian work force was unemployed. Brian (still known as George Rikard Bell) pursued a variety of jobs to support his struggling young family but it was difficult to find work.

Sometime later, in 1935, divorced from his first wife and known as Brian Abbot, he found his way into show business, getting a small role in Thoroughbred (1936) which led to him being cast by Ken G. Hall to play the lead in Orphan of the Wilderness (1936), although Hall later felt the actor's inexperience was evident in the final film.

By 1936, he had a new wife, Grace, and they were captured in a photo by Sam Hood taken at Walsh Bay published on page 2 of The Australian Women's Weekly on 24 October 1936 (which later became famous in Australia in 2014), just before he set sail on the SS Morinda to Lord Howe Island to star in the film Mystery Island.

His grandson Philip Powers has also worked extensively in the Australian film industry, producing forty Australian feature film soundtrack albums as well as working for the Sydney Symphony Orchestra.

== Disappearance ==
In October 1936, after completing work on Mystery Island (1937) on Lord Howe Island, Abbot and Leslie Hay-Simpson, a fellow actor, set out for Sydney in a 16-foot (4.9 m) open longboat called The Mystery Star. They were never seen again, despite a search of over a week involving a number of vessels, including the naval destroyer HMAS Waterhen.

Abbot's wife, Grace Rikard Bell, later sued the Producers and Citizens' Co-operative Assurance Co., Ltd. over her husband's death, claiming the company promised to insure his life for £1,000. The company (who were represented in court by Clive Evatt) alleged Abbot sailed back from Lord Howe Island in a small boat "quite unsuitable" for the journey without informing the company. The case was subsequently settled.

Stephen Vagg of Filmink called Abbott "a handsome Ronald Coleman type with a newsreader voice and bad teeth" who "might have gone on to have a decent career as a radio announcer" like another leading man for Ken G. Hall, Dick Fair "if he hadn’t been so enthusiastic about sailing."

=== Lord Howe Island Crossing ===
A significant number of boats have gone missing in the stretch of water between Sydney and Lord Howe Island over the years. A few weeks after Abbot's disappearance, a boat containing five men sailing from Sydney to the island also vanished.

== See also ==
- List of people who disappeared mysteriously at sea

== Filmography ==
- Mystery Island (1937)
- Orphan of the Wilderness (1936)
- Thoroughbred (1936)
