= Hollywood Masonic Temple =

American historic building

- U.S. National Register of Historic Places
- U.S. Historic district – Contributing property
- Los Angeles Historic-Cultural Monument
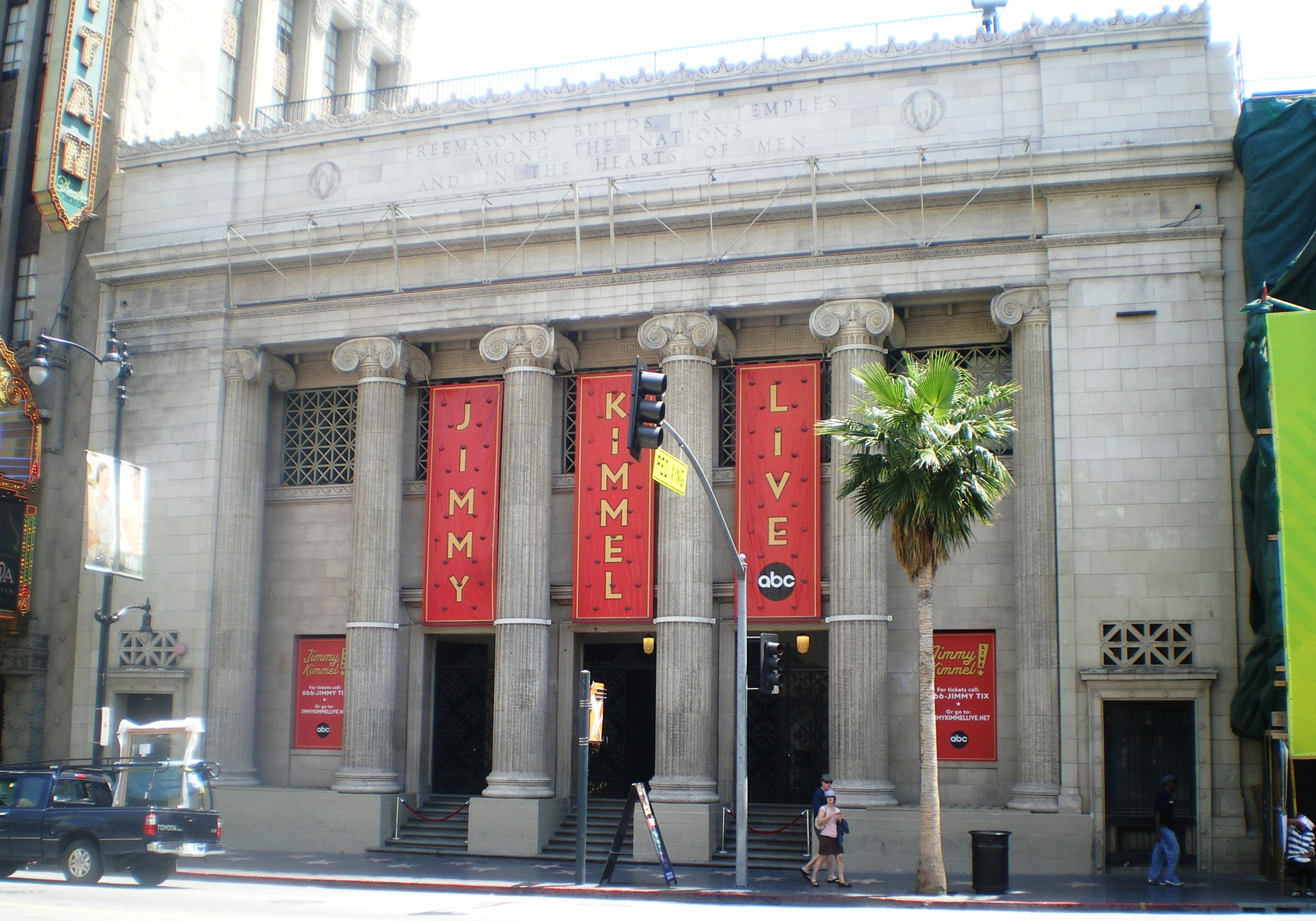
- Hollywood Masonic Temple, 2008

- Location within the Los Angeles metropolitan area Location within California Location within the United States
- Location: 6840 Hollywood Boulevard; Hollywood, California; 90028
- Coordinates: 34°6′4.73″N 118°20′24.5″W
- Area: 34,000 square feet (3,200 m^{2})
- Built: 1921
- Architect: John C. Austin
- Architectural style: Classical Revival
- Part of: Hollywood Boulevard Commercial and Entertainment District (ID85000704)
- NRHP reference No.: 85000355
- LAHCM No.: 277

Significant dates
- Added to NRHP: February 28, 1985
- Designated CP: April 4, 1985
- Designated LAHCM: June 12, 1984

The Hollywood Masonic Temple, known as the El Capitan Entertainment Centre and previously known as Masonic Convention Hall, is a building on Hollywood Boulevard in the Hollywood neighborhood of Los Angeles, California, U.S., that was listed on the National Register of Historic Places in 1985.

Built in 1921, the Masons operated the temple until 1982, when they sold the building after several years of declining membership. The building was then converted into a theater and nightclub, and ownership subsequently changed several times, until it was bought by the Walt Disney Company's Buena Vista Pictures in 1998. Since 2003, the building's theater has been the home to the Disney ABC television program Jimmy Kimmel Live!

== History ==
=== The Masonic Temple ===
In 1922, the Hollywood Lodge of the Masons relocated from their place at the future site of the Dolby Theatre. Development was led by lodge master Charles E. Toberman, a real estate developer who was also responsible for the Hollywood Bowl, Hollywood Roosevelt Hotel, Chinese Theatre, and Max Factor Salon. Design and construction was led by John C. Austin, who along with his associates was also responsible for Los Angeles City Hall, Griffith Park Observatory, Shrine Auditorium, and more. The original building cost $36,295 for the lot, $176,678 ($3.4 million in 2025) for construction, and $56,421 for furniture and fixtures. Toberman and fellow member Charles Boag formed a Hollywood Masonic Club to partly finance the building, offering membership subscriptions for $100.

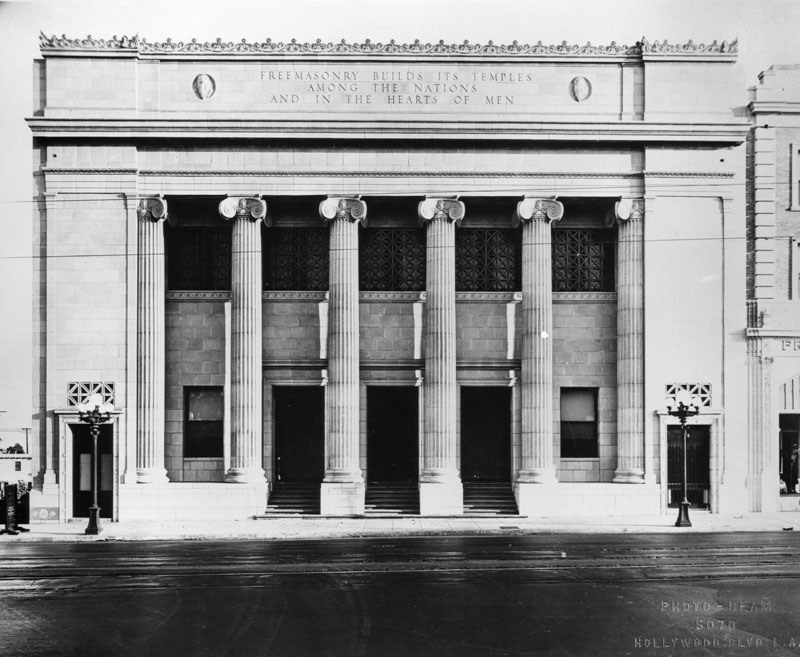
Hollywood Masonic Temple, 1922

When the new temple opened, it was one of the most impressive structures in Hollywood. It had a billiard room, pipe organ, ladies parlor, ballroom, and lodge rooms. One writer described the building as "unsurpassed for beauty, attractiveness and richness of equipment." The Los Angeles Times described the building this way in 2002:

It's an impassive presence that seems to transcend the ebb and flow of Tinseltown glamour — a somber Neoclassical temple that stands in stark contrast to the evolving parade of movers, shakers, panhandlers and paparazzi that have passed before it.

The grand ballroom was opened in February 1923; the opening ball featured a program on "the evolution of dance" featuring dancer Lucille Means. Many of Hollywood's elite over the years have been Masons, including Oliver Hardy, Harold Lloyd, Douglas Fairbanks, W.C. Fields, Cecil B. DeMille, D.W. Griffith, John Wayne, Roy Rogers, and Gene Autry.

During the Great Depression, many of the Masons lost their savings, and the Masons were forced to rent the ground floor to a social club that installed an illegal slot machine. After World War II, the Masons resumed full use of the structure, and in 1948, more than 300 people crowded into the Masonic Temple to attend a memorial service for D. W. Griffith. In 1969, longtime Mason Harold Lloyd was honored in a ceremony as his name was placed on the Hollywood Walk of Fame, directly in front of the Masonic Temple.

=== Opera theater and nightclub ===
By the late 1970s, Masonic membership had declined, and the Masons rented out ground-floor space to a restaurant. In 1980, the lodge moved out of the building to Van Nuys and renamed the Hollywood-West Valley Lodge. By 1982, the Masons could not afford upgrades to meet revised fire and seismic codes. The Masons sold the building to singer Rosita LaBello who converted the structure into the Hollywood Opera & Theater Company. The building's time with LaBello's opera and theater company was short-lived with only a few operatic productions. At the opera and theater company's failure, the building was sold back to the lodge.

In February 1986, Detroit developer James Hoseyni signed a 20-year lease with a $2.7 million ($7.93 million in 2025) three-year option to buy with building owner 6840 Hollywood Associates, an affiliate of Westmark Development. Westmark Development at that time had Nicholas Olaerts and Thomas Harnsberger as general partners, and they owned the El Capitan Theatre by 1992. Donald Bruce Randall, an architect of the Randall/Baylon Partnership of Los Angeles, and Tehran-born Kamal Kamooneh, the project's creative architect, with Hoseyni lead a renovation costing $1.5 million ($4.41 million in 2025) to house a 250-seat cabaret, 500-seat jazz theater and an 800-person dance club. The Blue and Red Halls were restored then modified for a disc jockey's podium, special electronic and lighting equipment and bars. The bathrooms were moved to the basement to create more floor space. In September 1987, the building was renovated again and reopened as the Hollywood Live Entertainment Pavilions with a cover charge for all venues. Hollywood Live lasted only a short time.

For the 1995 Toy Story premiere at the next door El Capitan Theatre, Disney rented the building for Totally Toy Story, a multimedia funhouse promotional event for the movie. In mid-July 1998, Buena Vista Pictures Distribution purchased the building from a bankrupt individual for $3.6 million ($7.11 million in 2025) to continue using it as a promotional venue.

=== El Capitan Entertainment Centre ===
In 2002, after extensive renovation, Disney reopened the building as the El Capitan Entertainment Centre. Disney restored original fixtures, including backlighted stone filigree, wrought iron torchieres, Batchelder tiles and old post boxes once used by Masonic officers.

On January 26, 2003, ABC—which is owned by Disney—premiered the late-night talk show Jimmy Kimmel Live!; the series has been broadcast from the Masonic Temple's theatre since its premiere.

== Architecture and design ==
The Hollywood Masonic Temple is a two story brick and concrete structure designed in the Neo-Classical style. The United States Department of the Interior has described the design as "a fine small scale example of its style" and "an excellent example of classical architecture on a modest scale."

The principal exterior feature is a colonnade of six outsized ionic columns in front of a recessed entrance. Eight stone steps lead up to the entrance, which consists of heavy wooden double doors decorated with inserts of glass covered with ornamental iron grillwork. Above this entrance, second story windows covered by crosscut iron grillwork create a continuous transom. Additionally, there are two slightly recessed street level entrances framed by tall pilasters at the east and west corners of the building. Molding around the entry doors mirrors the patterns of the stonework on the exterior, while iron and carved wood provide additional exterior detail.

The building is topped by a parapeted roof decorated with acanthus leaves, a Masonic motto flanked by circular medallions incised in the parapet. The architrave and the frieze are of patterned stone and have no embellishment.

The interior, reminiscent of Spanish Renaissance design, has undergone significant alterations over the years. On the first floor, a wide, tiled hallway culminates in a stepped-down entrance to the main auditorium at the rear of the building. Meeting spaces with tiled fireplaces are located on either side of the hall, and a stone stairway with wrought iron railings leads to the second floor, where two additional auditorium spaces are located. Each auditorium features elaborate beamed ceilings with carved wooden balconies, with the stages framed by carved and painted borders depicting Masonic ritual.

The building is rumored to have had a tunnel under Hollywood Boulevard to Grauman's Chinese Theatre that would allow movie stars to evade crowds at premieres. If the tunnel existed, it is possible that the B Line construction destroyed it.

== See also ==
Media related to Hollywood Masonic Temple at Wikimedia Commons

- List of Los Angeles Historic-Cultural Monuments in Hollywood
- List of Registered Historic Places in Los Angeles
- List of contributing properties in the Hollywood Boulevard Commercial and Entertainment District
