= Australia Has Wings =

- Written by: John Paton
- Narrated by: Ernest Walsh
- Cinematography: George D. Malcolm
- Production companies: Department of Information; Commonwealth Film Laboratories
- Distributed by: MGM; National Films Council
- Release date: 17 January 1941
- Running time: 10 minutes
- Country: Australia
- Language: English

Australia Has Wings is a 1941 short Australian documentary film made as propaganda for World War II which shows the development of the Australian aircraft industry, particularly production of the CAC Wirraway.

It was made by Commonwealth Film Laboratories for the Department of Information. Filming took place at Fisherman's Bend.

== Release ==
The film was screened in Australia and overseas. The Daily Telegraph said "initiative and craftsmanship are tops."
