= Yolande Turner =

British actor, screenwriter(1935–2003)

Yolande Turner, also known as Yolande Finch (12 December 1935 – 6 November 2003), was a British-South African actress and screenwriter.

Born in South Africa as Yolande Eileen Turnbull, she was the second wife of actor Peter Finch, by whom she had two children, Samantha and Charles Peter. She died on 6 November 2003 in London, aged 67, from undisclosed causes.

Her film career included roles in Five Miles to Midnight (1962), Girl with Green Eyes (1964) and Come Back Peter (1969). On television, she appeared in The Avengers in the 1966 episode entitled "The Girl From Auntie" and in the 1967 episode entitled "The 50,000 Pound Breakfast". She also appeared in the episodes "The work of Art" and "A Double in Diamonds" of The Saint and starred in Upstairs Downstairs (as Mrs Van Groeben), playing the part of a South African aristocrat.
