= Commonwealth Film Laboratories =

Australian film production company

Commonwealth Film Laboratories was an Australian production company that operated from 1925 to the 1950s. It was formerly located in Surry Hills, Sydney.

In addition to making films for the Government of Australia, they invested in and provided facilities for several Australian feature films.

== Select credits ==
- Conquest (1936) – short
- Eaglets (1935) – short
- Mystery Island (1937) – production company
- The Adventures of Dot (1938) – short – provided facilities
- Typhoon Treasure (1936)
- Seven Little Australians (1939) facilities
- Australia Has Wings (1941) – short
- Whose War Is It? (1943)
- The Rats of Tobruk (1944) – investor
- A Son Is Born (1946) – built sets
