= The Man They Could Not Hang (disambiguation) =

The Man They Could Not Hang is a 1939 American horror film starring Boris Karloff.

The Man They Could Not Hang may also refer to:

- John Babbacombe Lee, an Englishman also known as "The Man They Could Not Hang"
  - The Man They Could Not Hang (play), a 1911 play based on Lee's life
  - The Life Story of John Lee, or The Man They Could Not Hang (1912 film), an Australian silent film based on the play
  - The Life Story of John Lee, or The Man They Could Not Hang (1921 film), an Australian silent film remake of the 1912 film
  - The Man They Could Not Hang (1934 film), an Australian film based on Lee's life
  - The Man They Could Not Hang (book), a 2005 book about Lee's life
