= Joseph Samuel =

German criminal

Joseph Samuel (c. 1780 – April 1806) was a German known for having survived three execution attempts.

== Crimes ==
Samuel was convicted of robbery in 1795 and sentenced in 1801 to transportation to Australia, one of 297 convicted felons aboard the vessels Nile, Canada, and Minorca. Britain then maintained a penal colony at Sydney Cove in the Colony of New South Wales. Security in the early penal colonies was reinforced by isolation: guards trusted the Australian wilderness to kill any convicts who attempted to escape.

Samuel succeeded in escaping and, with a gang, robbed the home of a wealthy woman. In the process, a policeman named Joseph Luker, who was guarding her home, was murdered. The gang was hunted down and quickly captured, and during the trial, the woman recognised Samuel as one of the culprits. He confessed to robbing her home, but denied having murdered the policeman. The other members of the gang, including the leader, were acquitted due to lack of evidence, but because the woman identified Samuel, he was convicted and sentenced to death by hanging.

== Execution attempts ==
On 26 September 1803, Samuel and another criminal were driven in a cart to Parramatta, where hundreds of people had gathered to watch the execution. The execution method of the day was to have nooses fastened securely around their necks from gallows, and after they were allowed to pray with a priest, to have the cart driven away. This method caused death by slow strangulation and was not replaced by the drop method, which breaks the neck, by the British until the latter half of the 19th century.

The ropes used were made of five cords of hemp, which should have held 1,000 lb (450 kg) for up to five minutes without breaking, more than sufficient for human executions. The other criminal ultimately died by strangulation, but Samuel's rope snapped and he dropped to his feet, sprained an ankle and collapsed. The executioner hastily readied another rope, also made of five cords of hemp, placed it around Samuel's neck, forced him back onto the cart, and drove it away again. At this point, the other criminal was still kicking weakly.

When the cart drove out from under him the second time, Samuel fell again and the noose slipped off his neck, whereupon he again hit the ground. The executioner had been sure to have had the noose securely fastened around his neck, and as he stood Samuel up to try again, the crowd became boisterous, calling for Samuel to be freed. The executioner quickly readied a third rope of the same material, ordered the cart driven back, forced Samuel onto it, fastened the noose around his neck, secured it carefully and tightly, and ordered the cart driven away. The rope snapped, and Samuel dropped to the ground and stumbled over, trying to avoid landing on his sprained ankle.

Now the crowd stood in an uproar, and another policeman, watching on horseback, ordered the execution delayed momentarily while he rode away to find the governor. The governor was summoned to the scene, and upon inspection of the ropes, which showed no evidence of having been cut, and the other criminal, who had been executed with an identical rope, the governor and the crowd agreed that it was a sign from God that Joseph Samuel had not committed any crime deserving of execution, and his sentence was commuted to life imprisonment instead. Parramatta's town doctor tended to his sprained ankle.

In 1806, Samuel and other convicts tried to escape on a boat. The boat was swept away in a storm, with all presumed lost at sea.

== See also ==
- John Babbacombe Lee
- Willie Francis
