= Dance hall =

Hall for dancing

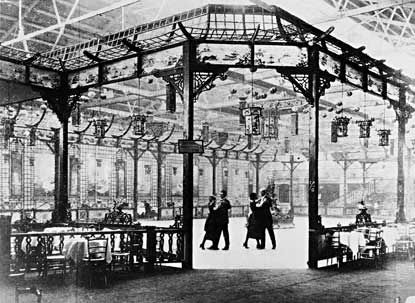
The dance floor at the Hammersmith Palais de Danse, London, around 1919

Dance hall in its general meaning is a hall for dancing, but usually refers to a specific type of twentieth-century venue, with dance clubs (nightclubs) becoming more popular towards the end of the century. The palais de danse was a term applied to purpose-built dance halls in Britain and Commonwealth countries, which became popular after the First World War.

Other structural forms of dance halls include the dance pavilion which has a roof but no walls, and the open-air platform which has no roof or walls. The open-air nature of the dance pavilion was both a feature and a drawback. The taxi dance hall was a dance hall with a specific arrangement, wherein the patrons hire hall employees to dance with them.

== General history ==
From the earliest years of the twentieth century until the early 1960s, the dance hall was the popular forerunner of the discothèque or nightclub. The majority of towns and cities in the West had at least one dance hall, and almost always featured live musicians playing a range of music from strict tempo ballroom dance music to big band, swing, and jazz.

The early days of rock n' roll were briefly played out in dance halls, until they were superseded by nightclubs.

== United States ==
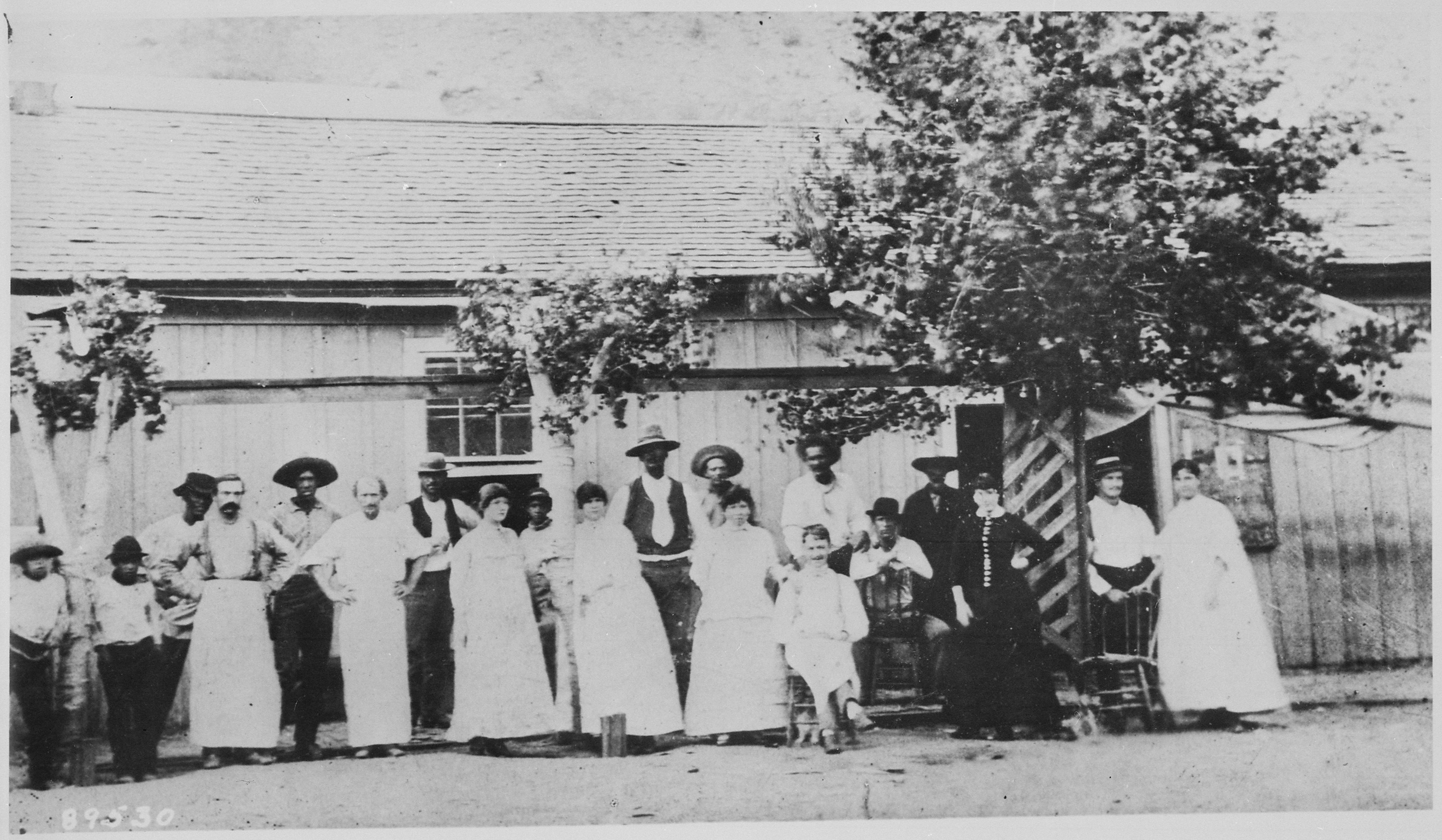
Customers and staff at Hovey's Dance Hall in Clifton, Arizona, in 1884; author Anton Mazzanovich next to the tree at right

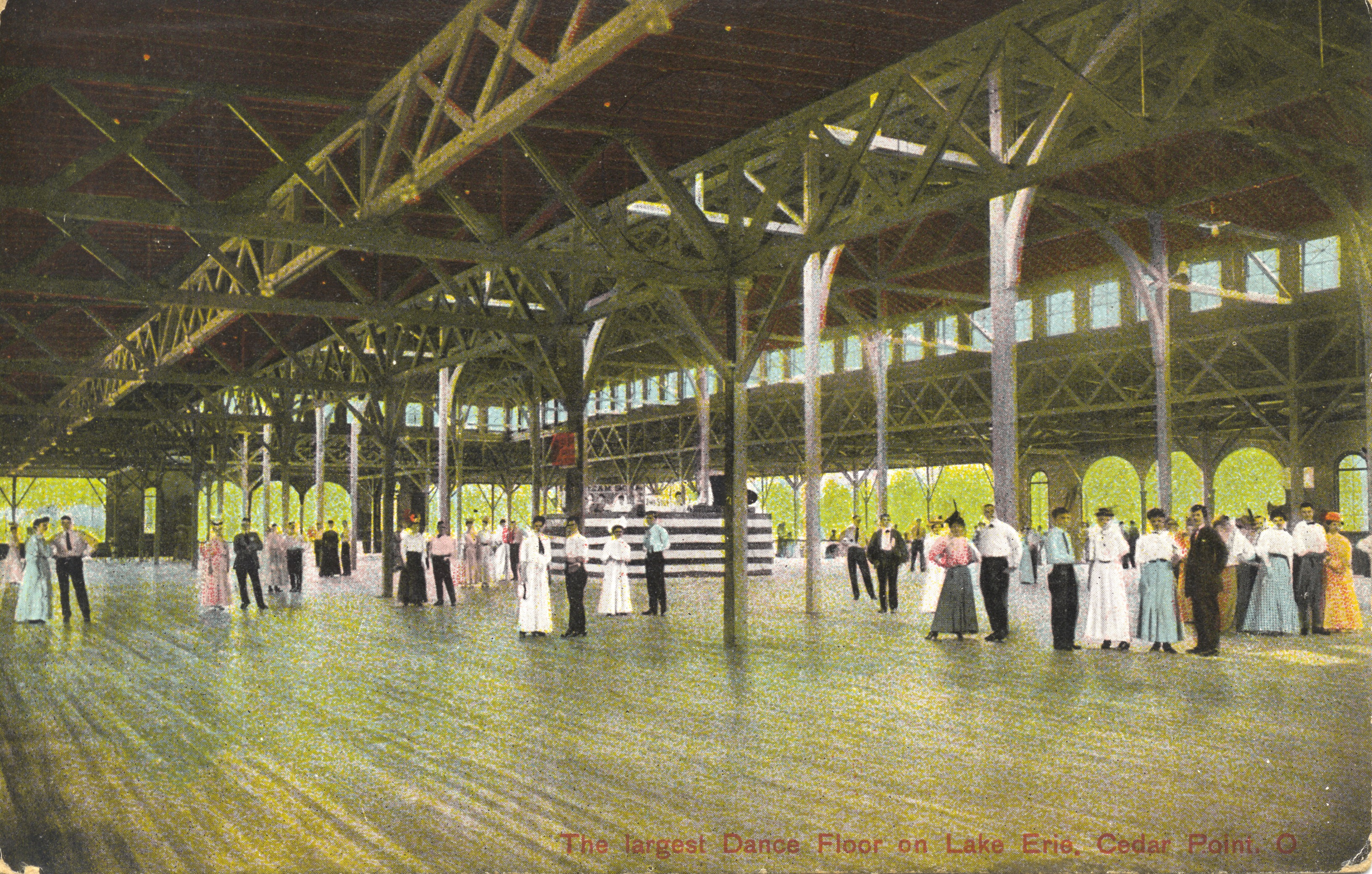
Early 20th century postcard, showing the dance pavilion on Cedar Point, Ohio, built 1882, known as "The largest Dance Floor on Lake Erie"

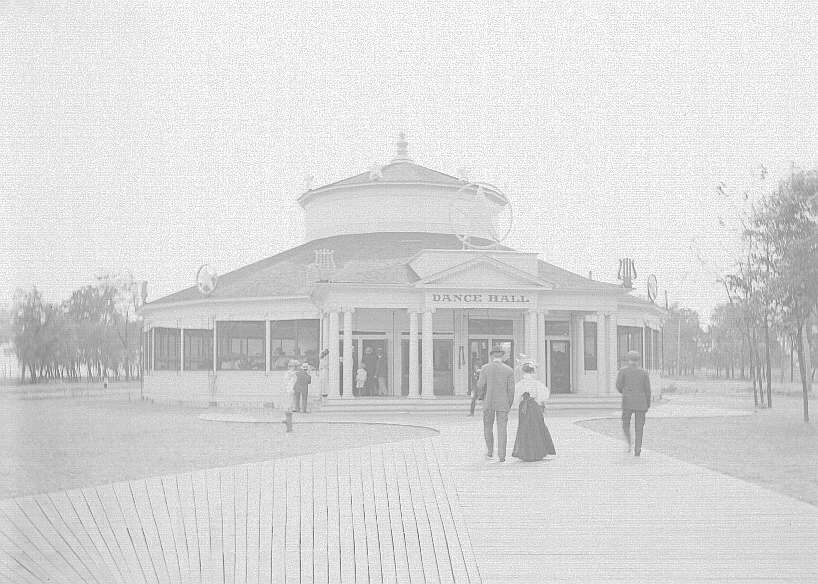
The Dance Hall at Toledo Beach, Michigan, 1906

Commercial dance halls in the United States began to appear toward the end of the nineteenth century and grew in popularity at the beginning of the twentieth century. These halls were generally frequented by working-class or immigrant teenagers that admired dance halls for their lack of chaperoning and convenience as cheap commercial leisure. The rapidly changing economy of the early twentieth century shifted the views many young adults had about the separation between work and leisure, increasing dance hall popularity from the 1900s into the 1920s.

With increased financial freedom, as compared to prior decades, young immigrant and working-class women were able to access dance halls, generally placed within urban areas, that did not require chaperones. Dance halls allowed young working-class women the opportunity to step outside of their extremely stressful home and work environments while not costing too much, or anything in some cases. These city dance halls were especially popular with newly independent immigrant women from more rural areas as country-side dances were often more closely monitored and tended to host styles of dancing that were considered more socially acceptable for performance in public spaces. The styles performed in city dance halls had dancing partners physically close, performing movements that would allow for limbs and body parts to graze each other in ways not seen in other partnered dance forms of the time.

Although interests in dance halls were growing, halls attracted negative attention from moral reformers and the media for the types of dancing done at these establishments, the sexual independence these environments allowed women, and the difficulty of regulating dance halls. Simple dance moves were already seen as morally wrong by select religious groups prior to the popularity of dance halls but with the additions of possibilities for prostitution, as well as access to alcohol, within dance halls reformers and religious leaders were increasingly against the existence of these halls. In order to discourage young adults from frequenting dance halls, media of the early twentieth century used subjective and inflammatory language to sway readers toward ideas that dance halls would morally corrupt young women while reformers petitioned to their local governments for regulation surrounding dance halls.

In 1917, with the approval of the vice investigation panel the Fosdick Commission, a committee was organized in Louisville, Kentucky to develop rules and regulations for public dance halls. According to middle- and upper-class white vice investigators and social reformers, many young people, who they believed to be lacking in proper moral character, attempted the "irregular dancing in vogue in the commercial halls" in the settlement house's dance hall and would be angered when approached by settlement hall staff or residents instructing them to dance differently. According to one report, "a resident would say to a new couple dancing irregularly, "You can't dance that way in this hall." The couple in self-defense would answer, "I can dance that way in every other hall in the city."

Starting in the early 1930s, The Savoy, a dance hall in Harlem (a black neighborhood in New York City) was the first truly integrated building in the United States — for both the dancers and the musicians. "We didn't care about the color of your skin. All we wanted to know was: Can you dance?"

Texas has a high concentration of community dance halls, the largest number of them built by German and Czech immigrants.

== United Kingdom ==
Following World War I in 1918, dancing became enormously popular in Britain, especially with working-class women. The purpose-built dance hall, or "palais de danse" emerged, the first being the Hammersmith Palais in London, opened in 1919.

== Australia ==
Dance halls, also termed palais de danse, became popular in Australia too, such as the Palais de Danse and the Wattle Path Palais de Danse, both in St Kilda, Melbourne, Victoria.

== Sweden and Finland ==
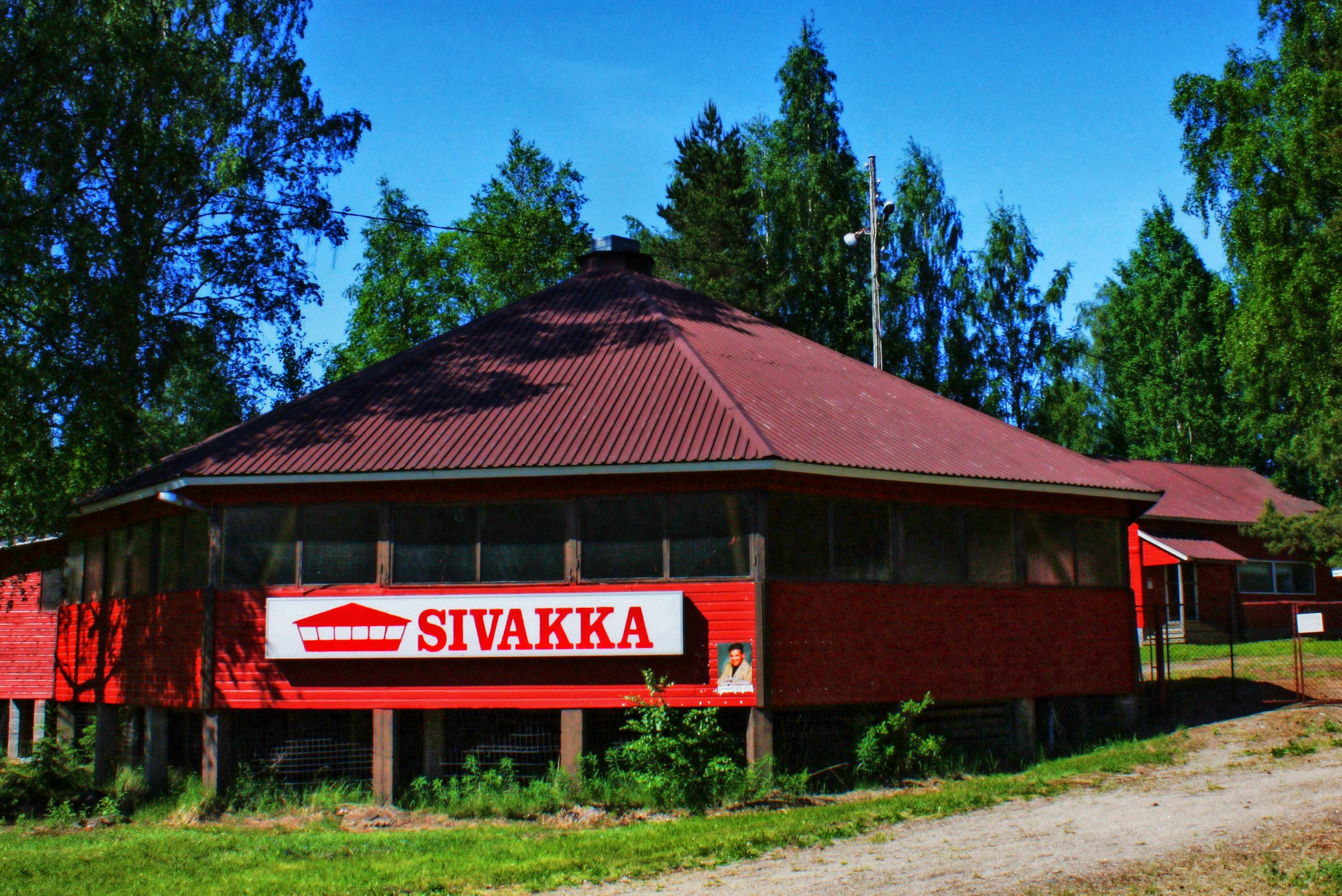
Sivakan lava dance pavilion in Sivakkavaara, Finland

In Sweden and Finland, open air dance pavilions have been used mostly in summer, but especially in Finland some have also been built to be used throughout the year. Formerly, the dance pavilions were often built at sites with beautiful landscape, for example by the lakes.

The Sivakan lava dance pavilion in Sivakkavaara, Kaavi, Finland has a history of more than a hundred years, as according to some sources, dances have been held on pavilion since 1907.

== See also ==
- Ballroom
- Dance club, the successor of the dance hall
