= The Life Story of John Lee, or The Man They Could Not Hang =

The Life Story of John Lee, or The Man They Could Not Hang may refer to:

- The Life Story of John Lee, or The Man They Could Not Hang (1912 film), a 1912 Australian silent film
- The Life Story of John Lee, or The Man They Could Not Hang (1921 film), a 1921 Australian silent film
