= The Man They Could Not Hang (1934 film) =

- Theatrical release poster
- Directed by: Raymond Longford
- Written by: Lorrie Webb; Eric Bedford
- Based on: dramatisation by Rigby C. Tearle of the autobiography of John Lee
- Produced by: Rigby C. Tearle (J.A. Lipman)
- Starring: Ronald Roberts
- Cinematography: George Malcolm; George Heath
- Edited by: George Malcolm; William Shepherd; Terry Banks
- Production company: Invicta Productions
- Distributed by: British Empire Films
- Release date: 1 June 1934
- Running time: 78 minutes
- Country: Australia
- Language: English
- Box office: £2,200 (Australia)

The Man They Could Not Hang is a 1934 Australian film directed by Raymond Longford about the life of John Babbacombe Lee, whose story had been filmed previously in 1912 and 1921. These silent films were called "one of the greatest box-office features that ever came out of this country." The sound film was not as successful.

== Synopsis ==
In Devonshire, John Lee works for wealthy spinster Emma Keys. On the night he is engaged to be married, Keys is murdered and Lee is arrested on circumstantial evidence and is convicted of murder. He is condemned to death but when the authorities try to execute him the trap doors will not open. They fail a second time and his sentence is commuted to life imprisonment. There is a sub-plot about smuggling and secret service agents.

== Cast ==
- Ronald Roberts as John Babbacombe Lee
- Arthur W. Sterry as John Lee Snr
- Ethel Bashford as Mrs Lee
- Olive Sinclair as Miss Keyse
- Patricia Minchin as Eliza Parrish
- Ethel Gabriel as Jane Allen
- Claire Barnes as Kate Farmer
- Sam Stern as Bertrand
- Les Warton as Ted Meeks
- George Doran as Captain Giles
- Leo Starke as Captain Hill
- Nugent Harrington as Tim Sanders
- Bobbie Beaumont as Polly Sanders
- W. Newton Carroll as Ned Sawkins

== Production ==
The production company responsible for the film, Invicta, was formed by J.A. Lipman, in 1933 with capital of £5,000. Lipman hired Raymond Longford and produced the film under the name of 'Rigby C. Tearle'. The story had been filmed twice before to great box office success. Eric Bedford wrote the scenario.

Lipman leased the No. 2 studios of Cinesound Productions at Rushcutters Bay, which had just been used for When the Kellys Rode. Shooting started on 12 March 1934 with Cinesound crew.

The cast included Arthur W. Sterry, who exhibited the 1912 film version of the story and directed the 1921 version.

The scene of Lee being released from prison was shot at Parramatta Gaol.

Some reels of the film were almost destroyed in a fire but survived. "The fellow always was lucky" quipped Everyones.

== Release ==
=== Censorship ===
A few days prior to the film's premiere, the New South Wales police requested a number of cuts be made to the film regarding its depiction of the police. This was done, even though the film was set in England. Everyones said "The latest action has dealt a further blow to the confidence of local producers, who are emphatic that the gamut of censorial deliberations their pictures have to run is severe to a point of injustice."

Longford was unable to attend the premiere due to illness. In Sydney is screened on a double bill with Cinesound Varieties.

=== Critical ===
The film was given a poor critical reception, the Sydney Morning Herald calling it:

Purely antiquarian. The very language of the characters is far-off and unreal... could have been directed in a more convincing way.. The one bright spot in the whole melancholy chronicle is the acting of Mr. Ron Roberts... Given better material, this young man could do some excellent work.

Everyones summarised it as "A poor effort, prejudicial to the advancement of Australian production." A more detailed review stated it was unlikely to repeat the success of the silent versions:

As a production it is a retrogres-sive step in Australian effort. The old story of John Lee... has been amplified with a smuggling plot and much confusing mystery that leads nowhere and only serves to slow down the action. In dress and settings an effort has been made to preserve the English atmosphere; and if these results look amateurish they are highly professional by comparison with the acting and dialogue... The one possible exception is Ronald Roberts... If Australian production is to establish itself firmly with Australian picture-goers, it never can be by virtue of such offerings.

The critic from The Argus said that the film was:

Closer to the far-fetched melodrama of The Streets of London than to the realism of the better films of to-day. The story... doubtless contains good dramatic material, but Invicta Films, an Australian company, have so disguised it that it appears sillier than the creations of the hack scenario writer's fancy. The complicated story has been unwound in a rambling, disjointed fashion, and the dialogue is so childishly stiff and melodramatic that even the most docile audience is fidgeting and giggling before the end. The cast is full of those stage types that went out with the appearance of Pinero – the red-eyed village maiden, who murmurs "Justice will prevail", the moustached French villain, who cannot speak without leering, smirking and kissing his finger-tips, and the stalwart British policeman, who arrests the wrong man with the noble words, "Duty is duty." The spirit of the piece seems to have possessed the cast completely, but perhaps the stiffness of the acting is due to their ignorance of the difference between stage and screen technique.

The Courier Mail did say "the prison scenes are realistically done, and at times the tension is strong."

The Sydney Sun said "It would be too hard to say that the cast is not capable, because the dialogue is so stilted that a brilliant and most experienced group of players could make but little of It. That Ronald Roberts, as John Lee, comes through as a human being, proves that he is one of the most promising of Australia's younger actors."

The film obtained a small release in England where it also received bad reviews.

=== Box office ===
The movie performed solidly in country areas.

However, by the end of 1934 a trade paper reported it as having earned only £2,200 at the Australian box office with the possibility of this going up to £3,000 ("although it's doubtful") and the sale to England giving it a chance to recoup the budget. It is unclear whether this happened.

In February 1935 Everyones observed a cinema in Perth reported the film "is once more demanding patronage... Well, well, there are some pictures that will never die." The film also reportedly did "big business" in Newcastle. BEF said it did well in Melbourne and Brisbane.

Longford never made another feature as director.
