= Arthur W. Sterry =

Media personality

Arthur William Sterry
- Born: 1883; Collingwood, Victoria, Australia
- Died: 1944 (aged 60–61); Botany, N.S.W.
- Occupations: Filmmaker, Actor, Theatrical Entrepreneur

Arthur William Sterry (1883–1944) was an Australian filmmaker, actor and theatrical entrepreneur. He was born in Collingwood, Victoria and his family moved to Wagga Wagga when he was young. At the age of 18 Sterry moved to Melbourne. He went to work for J. C. Williamson Ltd for a time and ended up establishing his own drama company, Arthur W Sterry's Dramatic Company. He later went to work for the theatrical entrepreneur Philip Lytton, performing in a number of shows including The Waybacks.

When Sterry left Lytton's company, he was given the stage and film rights to the play The Man They Could Not Hang, based on the life story of John Babbacombe Lee, including Lytton's 1912 version of the story. Sterry took the film on the road and enjoyed great commercial success exhibiting it, often giving lectures at screenings. He produced his own film version of this story in 1921, as well as a film adaptation of The Waybacks (1918).

He kept distributing films and dabbling in a number of areas, including retail and property investment, up until his death.

His wife Olive disappeared off a boat in 1915.

== Select credits ==
- Little Lord Fauntleroy (1909) – play, actor
- The Waybacks (1915) – play, actor
- The Life Story of John Lee, or The Man They Could Not Hang (1912) – film, distributor and exhibitor 1917 onwards
- The Waybacks (1918) – film, director
- The Life Story of John Lee, or The Man They Could Not Hang (1921) – film, director
- The Man They Could Not Hang (1934) – film, actor
- Tobacco Road (1944) – play, actor
