= The Waybacks (film) =

- Directed by: Arthur W. Sterry
- Based on: play by Philip Lytton novels by Henry Fletcher
- Produced by: Humbert Pugliese
- Starring: Vincent White
- Cinematography: Ernest Higgins
- Production company: Koala Films
- Release date: 18 May 1918
- Running time: 7,000 feet
- Country: Australia
- Languages: Silent film English intertitles

The Waybacks is a 1918 Australian silent film directed by Arthur W. Sterry. It is a rural comedy in the vein of Dad and Dave based on a play adaptation of a series of popular novels. Only part of the film survives today.

== Plot ==
The Wayback family visit Sydney from the bush. Dad and his son Jabex make friends with a group of bathing beauties at Bondi. Mum visits a fortune teller.

== Cast ==
- Vincent White as Dads Wayback
- Gladys Leigh as Mums Wayback
- Lucy Adair as Tilly
- Louis Machilaton as Jabex
- Rose Rooney as Frances Holmes
- Harry Hodson as Dan Robins
- William Turner as Charley Lyons
- George Hewlitt as Nigel Kelvin
- Lance Vane as Jack Hinds

== Original play ==
The Waybacks
- Poster from Tasmania production of play
- Original language: English
- Written by: Philip Lytton
- Genre: Rural comedy

Premiere
- Date: 1915

The Waybacks, also known as The Waybacks at Home and in Town, was a 1915 Australian play by Philip Lytton which was adapted from the stories by Henry Fletcher about the comic adventures of a rural family. The play was seen as attempt to cash in on the success of the theatre version of On Our Selection, and enjoyed almost as much popularity at the box office during its original run.

The plot involves the Wayback family visiting Sydney and having various adventures.

== Production ==
Director Sterry previously enjoyed success with The Life Story of John Lee, or The Man They Could Not Hang (1921). He appeared in the original stage production as Charley Lyons.

The film was shot near Windsor and in Sydney. Two of the cast, Gladys Leigh and Harry Hodson, reprised their roles from the stage production.

== Release ==
The film was released in August 1918. The premiere was held at Sydney Town Hall and resulted in a near riot as people sought tickets. The film went on to be a success with the box office. It continued to be seen in cinemas until 1925. It was re-released as The Waybacks of 1925.

Sterry planned a sequel, The Cornstalks, but it does not seem to have been completed.
