= Philip Lytton =

Australian actor

Philip Lytton (died 21 November 1949), real name Charles Ernest Phillips, was an Australian actor and theatrical entrepreneur best known for producing theatre shows that toured throughout Australia in the early part of the twentieth century. He started as an actor around 1900 and became friends with J. C. Williamson. With Williamson's assistance, he set up acting schools in Sydney and Melbourne, where his students sometimes appeared in Williamson shows.

From 1907 to 1923 he ran tent theatre companies which took theatre productions throughout country towns in Australia and New Zealand. Along with E. I. Cole, Lytton helped pioneer tent theatre in Australia, enabling shows to reach audiences without established venues. He often had three companies operating at one time, employing large numbers of people and covering large distances. In 1925 several of his company were injured in a train crash.

Among those actors who appeared in Lytton shows were Arthur W. Sterry, George Sorlie, George Edwards, Lily Dampier, Roy Redgrave, Raymond Longford, Lottie Lyell, and Alfred Rolfe. In 1920 he sold out part of his operation to George Sorlie but he continued producing shows himself.

== Notable productions ==
- The Cup Winner (1907)
- The Fatal Wedding (1910) – with Raymond Longford and Lottie Lyell, both of whom starred in the 1911 film version
- The Man They Could Not Hang (1912) – Lytton produced a film version of this in 1912
- The Girl From Outback (1912)
- The Waybacks (1915) – turned into a 1918 film
- Cappy Ricks
