= Sara Allgood =

Irish actress (1880–1950)

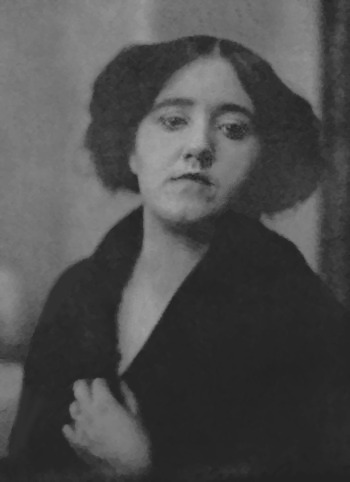
- Allgood c. 1912
- Born: Sarah Ellen Allgood; 30 October 1880; Dublin, Ireland
- Died: 13 September 1950 (aged 69); Woodland Hills, California, U.S.
- Resting place: Holy Cross Cemetery, Culver City, California
- Occupation: Actress
- Years active: 1918–1950
- Spouse: Gerald Henson (m. 1916; died 1918)
- Children: 1
- Relatives: Maire O'Neill (sister)

Sarah Ellen Allgood (30 October 1880 – 13 September 1950), known as Sara Allgood, was an Irish-American actress. She first studied drama with the Irish nationalist Daughters of Ireland and was at the opening of the Irish National Theatre Society.

In 1904, she had her first big role in Spreading the News and was a full-time actress the following year. In 1915, she toured Australia and New Zealand as the lead in Peg o' My Heart. Her acting career continued in Dublin, London, and the U.S. She appeared in a number of films, most notably being nominated for the Academy Award for Best Supporting Actress for her role as Beth Morgan in the 1941 film How Green Was My Valley. She became an American citizen in 1945 and died of a heart attack in 1950.

== Early life ==
Allgood was born on 30 October 1880, at 45 Middle Abbey Street in Dublin, Ireland, a daughter of Margaret (née Harold) and compositor George Allgood. Her mother was Catholic, while her father was Protestant. She had two baptisms, a Catholic baptism on 3 November 1880 and a Church of Ireland (Protestant Anglican) baptism on 21 November 1880.

She had seven siblings, one of whom was fellow actress Maire O'Neill, although the two were later reportedly estranged. A brother, Tom, became a Roman Catholic priest, who took the religious name of "Father Vincent".

After her father's death when she was a young girl, her mother returned to work as a furniture trader. Allgood began work as soon as she was able, apprenticed to a French polisher near her mother's workplace who sold high quality antique and modern furniture from their warerooms at 19 and 20 Bachelors Walk, Dublin, and who also operated as cabinet-makers, upholsterers, valuers, house agents, and auctioneers.

== Career ==
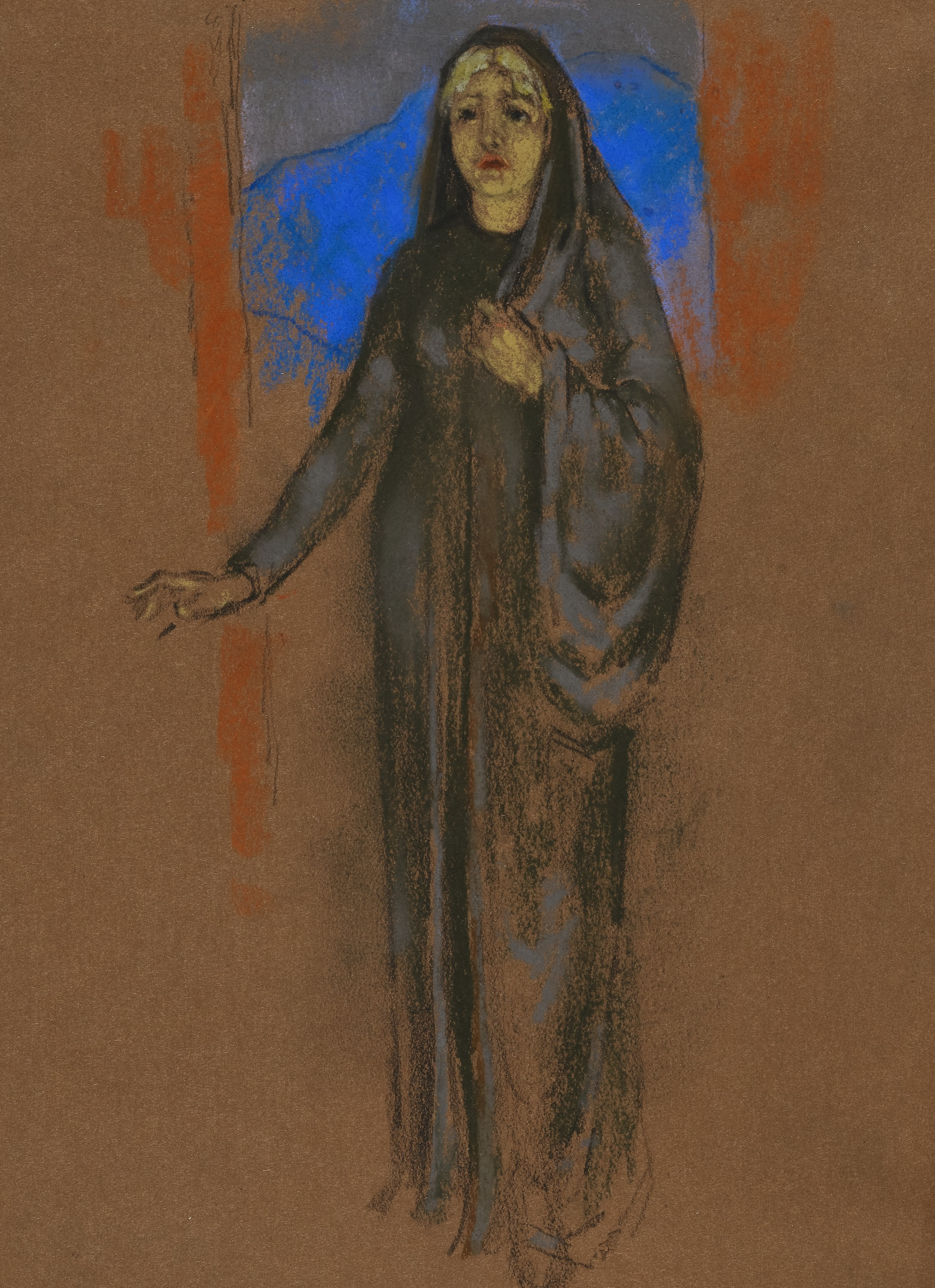
Pastel drawing of Allgood playing the title role in Cathleen ni Houlihan in a 1915 Abbey Theatre tour

Allgood joined the Irish nationalist Daughters of Ireland, where she first began to study drama under the direction of Maud Gonne and William Fay. She began her acting career at the Abbey Theatre and was in the opening of the Irish National Theatre Society. Her first big role was in December 1904 at the opening of Lady Gregory's Spreading the News. By 1905, she was a full-time actress, touring England and North America.

In 1915, Allgood was cast as the lead in J. Hartley Manners' comedy Peg o' My Heart which toured Australia and New Zealand in 1916. She played the lead role opposite her Peg o' My Heart co-star and then-husband Gerald Henson in J. A. Lipman's 1918 silent film Just Peggy, shot in Sydney. After his death and her return to Ireland, she continued to perform at the Abbey Theatre. Allgood toured with the Arts League of Service touring company in 1923-24. Her most memorable performance was in Seán O'Casey's Juno and the Paycock in 1924. She won acclaim in London when she played Bessie Burgess in O'Casey's The Plough and the Stars in 1926.

Allgood was frequently featured in early Hitchcock films, such as Blackmail (1929), Juno and the Paycock (1930), and Sabotage (1936). She had a significant role in Storm in a Teacup (1937).

After many successful theatre tours of America, she pursued a film career. She was nominated for a Best Supporting Actress Academy Award for her role as Beth Morgan in the 1941 film How Green Was My Valley. She had memorable roles in the 1941 retelling of Dr. Jekyll and Mr. Hyde, It Happened in Flatbush (1942), Jane Eyre (1943), The Lodger (1944), The Keys of the Kingdom (1944), The Spiral Staircase (1946), The Fabulous Dorseys (1947), and the original Cheaper by the Dozen (1950).

== Personal life ==
In September 1916, Allgood married her Peg o' My Heart co-star Gerald Henson while they were touring in Melbourne. In January 1918, they had a daughter named Mary who died one day later. In November of that year, the Spanish flu pandemic claimed Henson's life.

Allgood settled in Hollywood in 1940 and became an American citizen in 1945.

On 13 September 1950, at the age of 69, Allgood died of a heart attack at her home in Woodland Hills, California. She was buried in Holy Cross Cemetery, Culver City.

== Partial filmography ==
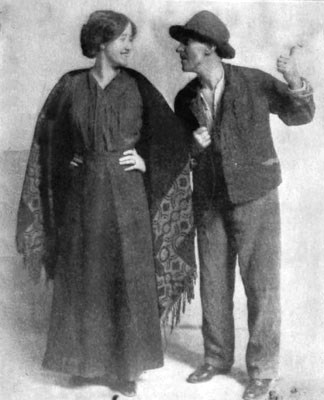
Allgood with J. M. Kerrigan in 1911

- Just Peggy (1918) - Peggy
- Blackmail (1929) - Mrs. White
- To What Red Hell (1929)
- Juno and the Paycock (1930) - Mrs. Boyle ('Juno')
- The World, the Flesh, the Devil (1932) - Emme Stanger
- The Fortunate Fool (1933) - Rose
- Lily of Killarney (1934) - Mrs O'Connor
- Irish Hearts (1934) - Mrs. Gogarthy
- Lazybones (1935) - Bridget
- Peg of Old Drury (1935) - Irish Woman on Boat (uncredited)
- The Passing of the Third Floor Back (1935) - Mrs. de Hooley
- Crime Unlimited (1935) - Jewel Thief (uncredited)
- Riders to the Sea (1936, Short) - Maurya
- Pot Luck (1936) - Mrs. Kelly
- It's Love Again (1936) - Mrs. Hopkins
- Southern Roses (1936) - Miss Florence
- Sabotage (1936)
- Kathleen Mavourneen (1937) - Mary Ellen O'Dwyer
- Storm In A Teacup (1937) - Honoria Hegarty
- The Sky's the Limit (1938) - Mrs. O'Reilly
- The Londonderry Air (1938) - Widow Rafferty
- On the Night of the Fire (1939) - Charwoman
- That Hamilton Woman (1941) - Mrs. Cadogan-Lyon
- Dr. Jekyll and Mr. Hyde (1941) - Mrs. Higgins
- Lydia (1941) - Mary
- How Green Was My Valley (1941) - Mrs. Morgan
- Roxie Hart (1942) - Mrs. Morton
- This Above All (1942) - Waitress
- It Happened in Flatbush (1942) - Mrs. 'Mac' McAvoy
- The Light of Heart (1942)
- The War Against Mrs. Hadley (1942) - Mrs. Michael Fitzpatrick
- Life Begins at Eight-Thirty (1942) - Alma Lothian, Robert's Aunt
- City Without Men (1943) - Mrs. Maria Barton
- Forever and a Day (1943) - Cook (1917) (scenes deleted)
- Jane Eyre (1943) - Bessie
- The Lodger (1944) - Ellen Bonting
- Between Two Worlds (1944) - Mrs. Midget
- The Keys of the Kingdom (1944) - Sister Martha
- The Strange Affair of Uncle Harry (1945) - Nona
- Kitty (1945) - Old Meg
- The Spiral Staircase (1946) - Nurse Barker
- Cluny Brown (1946) - Mrs. Maile
- The Fabulous Dorseys (1947) - Mrs. Dorsey
- Ivy (1947) - Martha Huntley
- Mother Wore Tights (1947) - Grandmother McKinley
- Mourning Becomes Electra (1947) - Adam Brant's Landlady
- My Wild Irish Rose (1947) - Mrs. Brennan
- Man from Texas (1948) - Aunt Belle
- One Touch of Venus (1948) - Landlady
- The Girl from Manhattan (1948) - Mrs. Beeler
- The Accused (1949) - Mrs. Conner
- Challenge to Lassie (1949) - Mrs. MacFarland
- Cheaper by the Dozen (1950) - Mrs. Monahan
- Sierra (1950) - Mrs. Jonas (final film role)
