= Just Peggy =

- Directed by: J. A. Lipman
- Written by: J. A. Lipman
- Produced by: J. A. Lipman
- Starring: Sara Allgood
- Production company: Mia Films
- Distributed by: Quality Features
- Release date: 10 August 1918
- Running time: 6,500 feet
- Country: Australia
- Languages: Silent film English intertitles

Just Peggy is a 1918 Australian silent film starring Sara Allgood and Gerald Henson, who were married in real life. It is a lost film.

== Plot ==
Unable to bear the teasing of his colleagues, hunchbacked musician Peter Wallace leaves for the country. He falls in love with and marries blind girl Helen Raymond, who has a beautiful voice. They have a baby and Helen regains her sight at the birth of her child. Once she realises Peter is a hunchback she goes temporarily insane and leaves him, abandoning her daughter at old Matha's with a violin, and taking refuge at a convent. When Helen gets better she leaves the convent and becomes an opera singer.

The daughter is raised as "just Peggy" and grows into a beautiful young woman, and talented musician. She is educated at the expense of Frank Leighton, an impresario. Peter is brought in to conduct and orchestra while Helen is singing; she seems him and faints but when she wakes up the two of them are reunited and try to find Peggy. Peggy winds up performing as a violinist with her old violin; Peter recognises it and she is reunited with her mother and father. Peggy then marries Frank.

== Cast ==
- Sara Allgood as Peggy
- Harry Thomas as Peter Wallace
- Nellie Phillips as Helen Raymond
- Rigby C Tearle as theatrical manager
- Gerald Henson as Frank Leighton
- Lily Rochefort as Martha
- Tralie Nicholson as Madge Norton
- J. A. Lipman as Roland Tweedie

== Production ==
The film was allegedly based on a true story. J. A. Lipman was a theatre producer and actor who wanted to move into filmmaking. He wrote the script as a vehicle for Sara Allgood, then touring Australian theatres in Peg O' My Heart.

Lipman built a small outdoor studio in Seaforth, Sydney, and shot the film there and on location at Palm Beach and Manly in early 1918. "Mia" in Mia Films was short for "made in Australia". Allgood was paid £100 a week for the six-week shoot. Harry Thomas was a leading Sydney elocutionist.

== Reception ==
The film was very popular on release and made a solid profit. One reviewer called it a "quality picture".

Another thought the star was "not suited to the story, and in spite of an interesting personality, cannot be said to be the success in pictures that she was on the stage. The story lead is an average one and the director, J. A. Lipman, must be credited with considerable skill in handling it so well."
