= HM Prison Exeter =

Prison in Devon, England

HMP Exeter
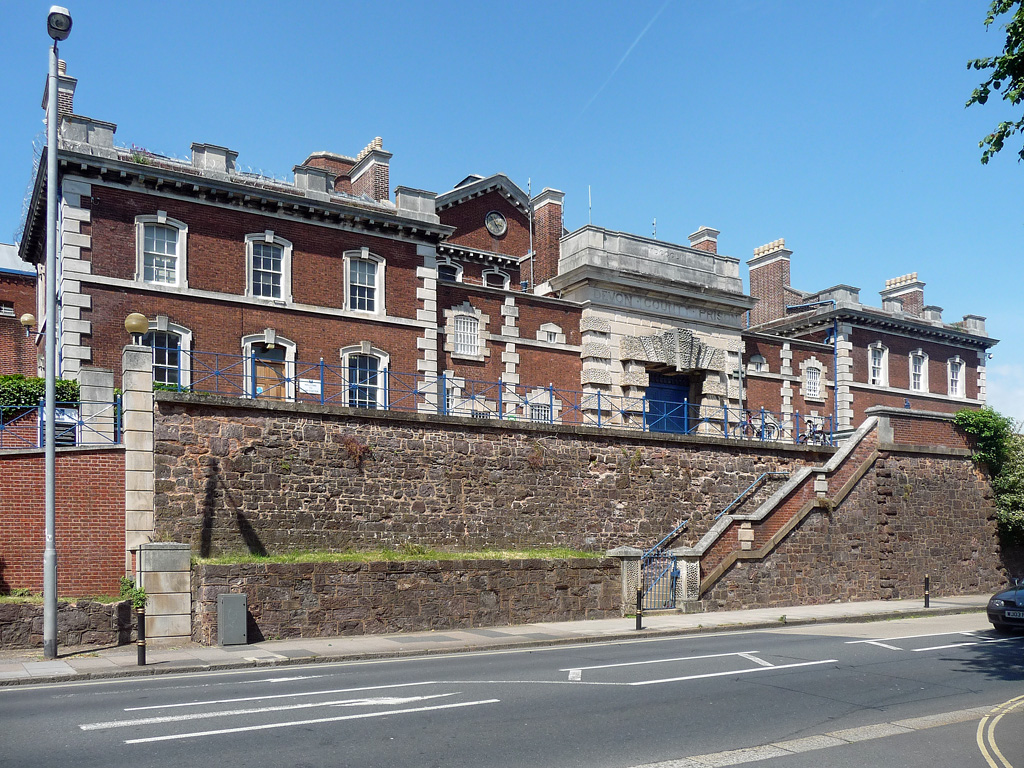
- HM Prison Exeter in 2014. The inscription above the entrance gate reads "Devon County Prison".
- Interactive map of HMP Exeter
- Location: Exeter, Devon; 50.72848°N 3.5321°W
- Security class: Adult Male category B local and resettlement
- Capacity: 321
- Population: 321 (May 2023)
- Opened: 1853
- Managed by: HM Prison Services
- Governor: Ian Walters
- Website: Exeter at justice.gov.uk

HM Prison Exeter is a category B local and resettlement men's prison, located in Exeter in the county of Devon, England. It holds men sentenced by the courts of Devon, Cornwall, Dorset and Somerset. There are also prisoners from further afield who have been transferred from other prisons. Exeter Prison is operated by His Majesty's Prison Service.

== History ==
In the reign of King Henry I (1100–1135) the manor of Bicton, near Exeter, was granted by the king to John Janitor, who held the manor by the feudal tenure of grand serjeanty requiring him to provide a county jail, which was an honourable position of trust. The Latin noun Janitor means "door-keeper", generally understood in the sense janitor carceris, "door-keeper of a jail". Thus the tenant took his surname from his form of tenure. The county prison was later transferred to a building beneath Exeter Castle in the county capital Exeter, but the feudal tenant of Bicton was nevertheless for many centuries required to meet part of the repair and maintenance costs of the newly sited jail. The Devon topographer John Swete (d.1821) stated that Dennis Rolle Esq. (d.1797), the proprietor of Bicton at the time of his visit, had paid the sum of £1,000 to the Treasury to be released in perpetuity from his vestigial feudal liabilities. The release was effected by an Act of Parliament in 1787, Public Act, 27 George III, c. 59 summarised as:

"An Act for making and declaring the Gaol for the County of Devon, called the High Gaol, a Public and Common Gaol; and for discharging Denys Rolle and John Rolle Esquires, and their respective Heirs and Assigns, from the Office of Keeper of the said Gaol; and for improving and enlarging the same or building a new one; and also for taking down the Chapel in the Castle of Exeter; and for other Purposes therein mentioned".

The current Exeter prison was built in 1853, and is of a typical Victorian design, by local architect John Hayward. The prison was based on the plan of the model prison at Pentonville, with four residential wings.

The prison has been the setting for many executions. Of particular note is the attempted execution of John Babbacombe Lee in February 1885. Three attempts were made to carry out his execution. All ended in failure as the trap door of the scaffold failed to open. This was despite the fact it had been carefully tested by James Berry, the executioner, beforehand. As a result, Home Secretary Sir William Harcourt commuted the sentence to life imprisonment. Lee continued to petition successive Home Secretaries and was finally released from Exeter prison in 1907.

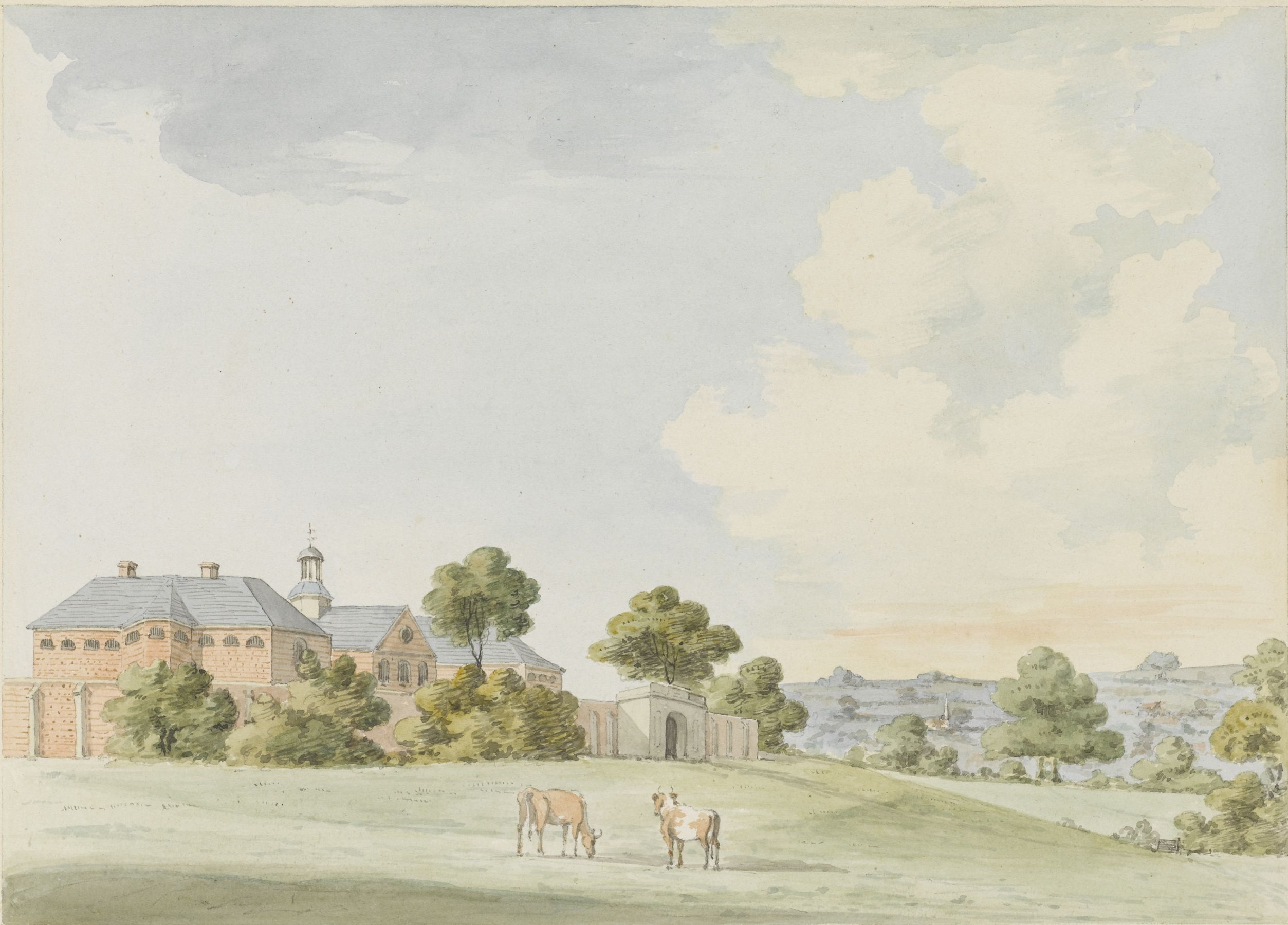
Exeter Gaol painted in 1810 by John White Abbott.

== Criticisms ==
In August 1999 a report by His Majesty's Chief Inspector of Prisons severely criticised conditions at Exeter prison, with some inmates still having to slop out despite government claims that the practice had been eradicated from all jails three years previously. The report went on to state that Exeter Prison seemed to be "at the end of the line" and that industrial relations there bordered on anarchy.

On 8 July 2002, ex-inmate Gareth Connett broke into Exeter Prison and protested on the roof for four hours, demanding compensation for an alleged injury caused by another inmate. The prison successfully denied liability.

A report issued by the Prison Reform Trust in May 2005 stated that Exeter was struggling with the result of overcrowding. The report criticised the lack of meaningful activities at the prison, resulting in inmates spending too much time locked in their cells. The report also noted, however, that Exeter Prison was among the best in the country at helping to rehabilitate offenders. Exeter was highlighted again months later for its overcrowding by the Howard League for Penal Reform, who stated that the prison was running at 70% over capacity.

In recent years, Exeter Prison has regularly featured in the Howard League for Penal Reform's list of most crowded prisons in the UK. In 2014, it was revealed that the number of prison staff employed at Exeter Prison had dropped by 32%, yet numbers of inmates still continued to remain as high. A 2013 inspection concluded that there were 'weaknesses and gaps' in the operation of the prison, and that the establishment was 'old and difficult to maintain.'

The Independent Monitoring Board found staffing levels (set by the Ministry of Justice) were too low and optimum care of prisoners, specially vulnerable prisoners could not be ensured. Violence and self-harm were at worrying levels. Prisoners with psychiatric issues may need to wait months for a place in a secure mental health unit.

== The prison today ==
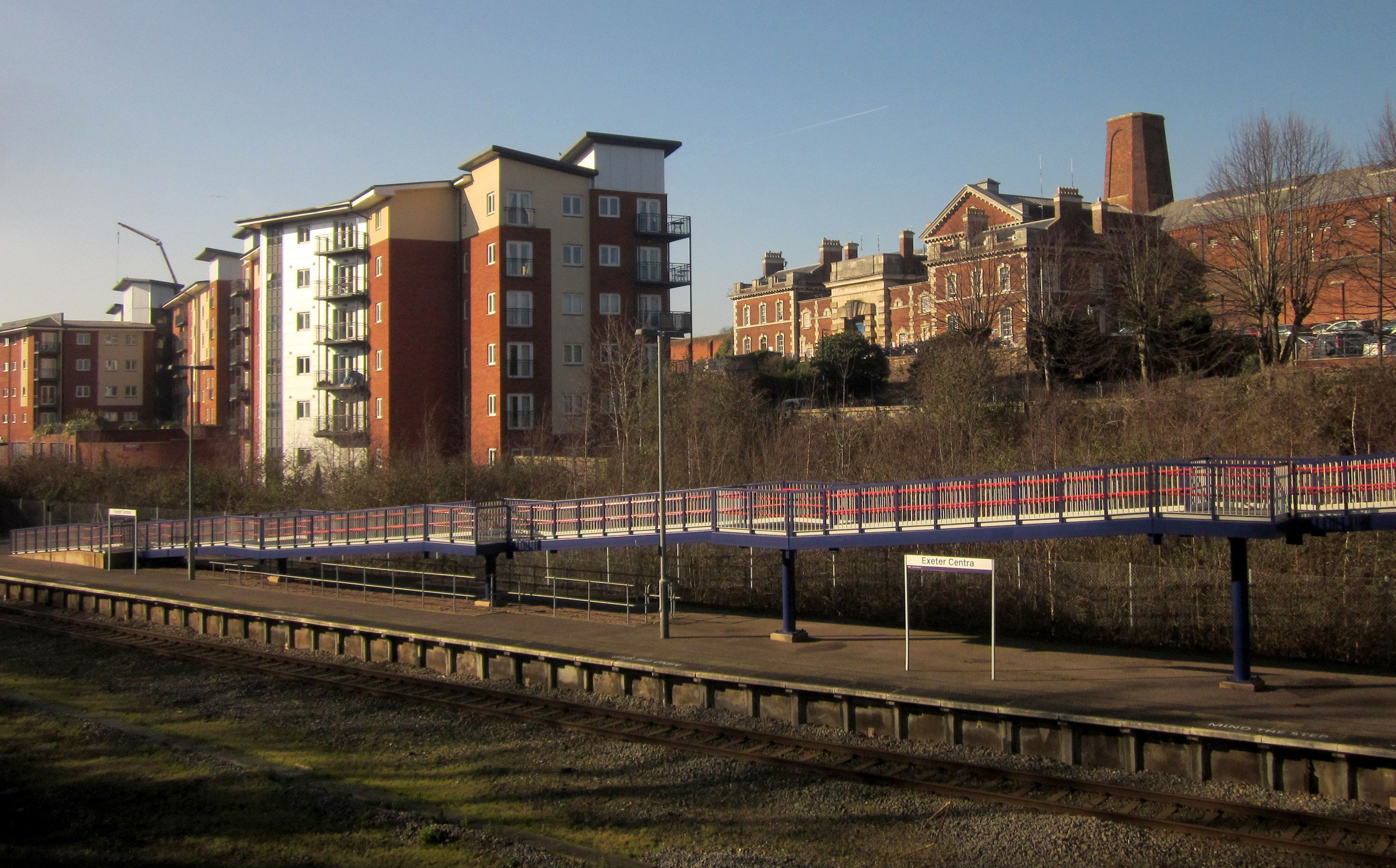
The prison (right) from Exeter Central Station

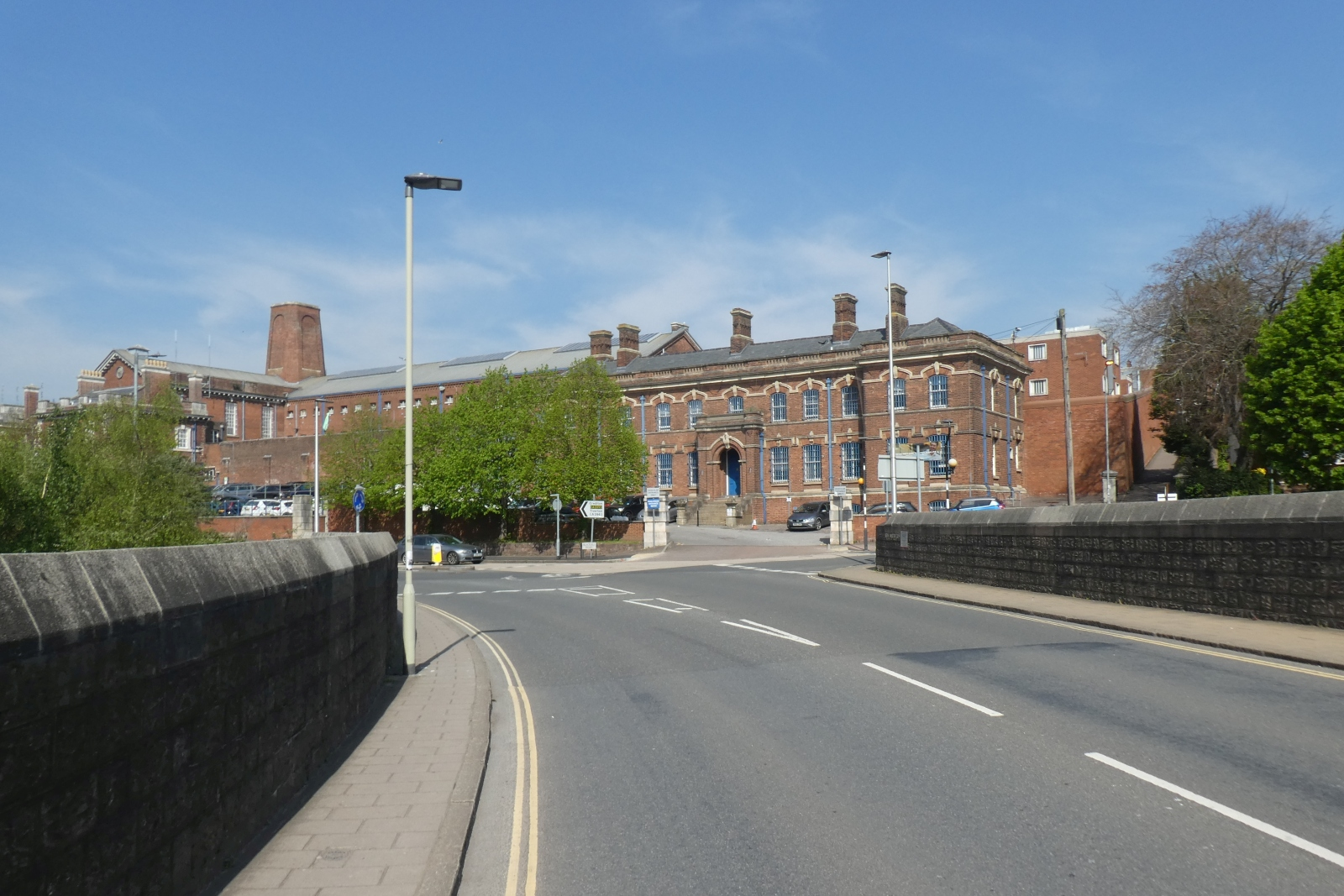
The prison viewed from New North Road in 2020

HMP Exeter accepts all male adults and young offenders committed to prison by the courts from Cornwall, Devon and West Somerset.

The prison offers prisoners employment in the kitchens, waste management, stores and domestic cleaning. Exeter also offers accredited training courses in education, computers, sports and vocational skills that link with local employer requirements. The prison was awarded 'across the board' Grade 2 accreditation by Ofsted in August 2013 for its Learning and Skills provision and continues to drive up the quality of their reducing reoffending services.

In May 2018 Peter Clarke put Exeter Prison under an emergency protocol having found the prison, “unequivocally poor” with soaring levels of violence and self-harm. An inspection in May had found high levels of self-harm and 6 suicides, also high levels of assaults against prisoners and staff and high drug use. Clark wrote, “During the inspection we saw many examples of a lack of care for vulnerable prisoners which, given the recent tragic events in the prison, were symptomatic of a lack of empathy and understanding of the factors that contribute to suicide and self-harm.” Clarke maintained prison safety had “significantly worsened in many respects” since the August 2016 inspection. Prisoner on prisoner assaults rose by 107% and assaults on staff rose by 60% since the previous inspection. Clarke noted there was a, “strong smell” of drugs in some wings and some prisoners were, “clearly under the influence”. Many cells needed repair with broken windows, leaking toilets and sinks and badly screened toilets. Deborah Coles of Inquest said, “This cannot be blamed on staffing levels. That serious safety concerns are systematically ignored points to an institutional and shameful indifference to the well-being of prisoners. In any other setting this institution would be closed down.”

== Notable inmates ==
- Charlie Hutchison - Black-British anti-fascist, served 3-month sentence for stealing army clothing in 1940, released early
- John Babbacombe Lee - convicted, later pardoned, murderer
- Emmeline Pankhurst - held there in 1913 after an arrest for suffragette activity.

== See also ==
- Black Assize of Exeter 1586
- Murder of Kate Bushell – high-profile unsolved murder in Exeter in 1997, said to have been committed by a previous offender
