= Francis and Eliza (1782 ship) =

English brig

History

Great Britain
- Name: Francis and Eliza
- Builder: River Thames, England
- Launched: 1782
- Fate: Sold 1820

General characteristics
- Tons burthen: 345, or 346, or 377, or 38344/94 (bm)
- Length: 109 ft 1 in (33.2 m) (stem to stern)
- Beam: 28 ft 6 in (8.7 m)
- Propulsion: Sail
- Complement: 1797:35; 1814:24
- Armament: 1797: 16 × 6-pounder guns + 4 × swivel guns; 1814:4 guns; 1815:6 × 9-pounder carronades
- Notes: Two decks & three masts

Francis and Eliza was a brig built in 1782 upon the River Thames, England. An American privateer captured her in 1815 while she was transporting convicts from Ireland to Port Jackson, New South Wales, and then released her. She was condemned in 1819 by a United States court for having violated U.S. law, and was sold in 1820.

== French Revolutionary Wars ==
On 20 January 1797 Captain Thomas Todd received a letter of marque for Francis and Eliza.

== Napoleonic Wars ==
On 1 January 1804 Francis and Eliza was one of a convoy of leaving Portsmouth for the West Indies. On 1 February 43 vessels, including Francis and Eliza returned to Plymouth, together with their escort, Courageux.

In 1805–1806, Francis and Eliza was one of the transport vessels that were part of the expedition under General Sir David Baird and Admiral Sir Home Riggs Popham that would in 1806 capture the Dutch Cape Colony.

Francis and Eliza sailed in March 1806 as one of seven cartel ships repatriating to Holland the Dutch troops captured at the Cape, and their dependents.

In November 1813, under Captain William Harrison and as part of a fleet escorted by HMS Jalouse, Francis and Eliza transported injured troops and some French prisoners from St. Andero back to England.

In 1813, the EIC had lost its monopoly on the trade between India and Britain. British ships were then free to sail to India or the Indian Ocean under a licence from the EIC. Francis and Eliza's owners applied for a licence on 29 July 1814, and received the licence on 2 August.

== Convict transport ==
Francis & Eliza and Canada were the next convict ships to depart Ireland bound for New South Wales after the departure of Archduke Charles in May 1812. They departed Cork, Ireland, in convoy on 5 December 1814. Francis & Eliza was under the command of William Harrison and carried 54 male and 69 female convicts.

On 4 January 1815, off Madeira, Francis and Eliza having parted from the convoy in a storm, had the misfortune to encounter the American 21-gun privateer Warrior, under the command of Guy Champlin. (Note: American records describe Warrior as a brig of 430 tons (bm), armed with 21 guns and carrying a crew of 150 men.) After the Americans had stripped Francis and Eliza of her guns and ammunition they allowed her to sail on. A few of her crew joined the Americans. However, Warrior had also captured Hope, Pringle, master, which had been sailing from Glasgow to the river Plate. Apparently Champlin put his prisoners from Hope on Francis and Eliza. American and British reports disagree on whether the Americans created disorder on board Francis and Eliza by stripping her of everything they could plunder and freeing the prisoners, or whether they found disorder and helped her crew reestablish order. (Note: Bateson reports that the Americans plundered Francis and Eliza of her guns, ammunition, and much of her cargo.)

Francis and Eliza arrived in Teneriffe on 10 January. HMS Harrier was there and helped reestablish order. Later Commander Sir Charles Thomas Jones claimed salvage on her on behalf of his officers and crew, arguing that they had had to restore order; the suit failed.

From Tenerife Francis and Eliza, in company with Canada, which too was carrying convicts, sailed to Sierra Leone, under escort of HMS Ulysses. Sierra Leone was in the throes of an epidemic. Still, Francis and Eliza took on board a detachment from the 1st Regiment of the Royal African Corps to serve as guards. (Note: This was the only occasion on which the Royal African Corps provided guards on a convict ship.) Canada and Eliza and Francis sailed to Cape Town, arriving on 2 May. There they spent some three weeks. They sailed together, but then parted.

Canada and Francis and Eliza arrived at Port Jackson on 5 and 8 August. On Francis and Eliza, two male and four female convicts had died on the voyage.

She left Port Jackson on 26 October bound for Batavia. On 3 January 1816 she was in the Straits of Sunda on her way to Batavia.

Francis and Eliza was at the Cape in late July, and on 31 August was at St Helena. She arrived at Mounts Bay, Ireland, on 8 October, under the command of Captain Kennedy. William Harrison had died on the voyage.

== Seizure ==
Lloyd's List reported that Francis and Eliza had been seized at New Orleans for breach of the Navigation Laws and was to be sold on 25 February 1820.

On 28 February 1819 Francis and Eliza had left London for Margarita Island. She was carrying 170-180 men and arms for Simon Bolivar's army there. She stopped at Trinidad and sailed on, arriving in early April. She delivered her passengers and cargo and then remained in the area until 8 November, looking for other employment. She then sailed for New Orleans with William Coates as her captain. He was the fourth master since she left England on this voyage. On her way she stopped outside Falmouth, Jamaica, to replenish her provisions as her crew had been on short rations for some time. Coates went into Falmouth on a boat to procure provisions, and to register with the authorities there as Francis and Eliza's new master. They would not register him as master, however, unless he brought her into port. Coates refused and after securing some supplies that were brought out to her, sailed to New Orleans. As she arrived, the U.S. coastguard hailed her and asked where she was from. Coates replied, "Jamaica". At that point the Americans arrested Francis and Eliza. The issue was that as Britain had closed certain ports to American ships, the United States passed a Navigation Act that specified that a British ship that stopped at one of these ports, such as for example Falmouth, was subject to seizure.

Francis and Eliza was libeled on 11 December 1819 and condemned on 31 December. The court ruled that Francis and Eliza had stopped at Falmouth seeking a cargo, and so was in violation of the American law.

The court sold her on 25 February 1820 to Duman de la Croix for US$6,435 inclusive of 20 guns and some water casks. The owners, Charles Herring and Christopher Richardson, of London, protested the seizure and sale, and in 1823 the Supreme Court of the United States held for the owners. Because she had been sold and so could not be restored to her owners, the United States Government returned her purchase price to them less certain costs.

== Fate ==
Currently it is unclear what happened to Francis and Eliza after her sale to de la Croix.
