= The Man They Could Not Hang (play) =

- Original language: English
- Written by: Claude E. Murrell
- Subject: John Babbacombe Lee
- Genre: Melodrama

Premiere
- Date: 1911

The Man They Could Not Hang is a play based on the life of John Babbacombe Lee by Claude E. Murrell.

The newspaper Lloyd's Weekly had published Lee's story, contributing to the re-opening of the case and Lee's release. Lloyd's then suggested to Lee that he dramatise his story to make some money; Lee agreed and Claude Murrell was commissioned.

Another account said the play was written by Fred Davenport. It is possible there were two plays.

The play was toured throughout Australia in the 1910s by various companies including that of Philip Lytton. One review said the play was "devoid of literary merit."

The play was turned into an Australian film, The Life Story of John Lee, or The Man They Could Not Hang (1912). This was remade twice.

According to a 1912 Bulletin article the play had "an intensely bellowdramatic structure, erected on a basis of unique fact." It pointed out that an executioner tried to kill Lee three times "but the platform wouldn't fall to permit of the prisoner dropping into space" so eventually the Home Secretary commuted Lee's sentence to penal servitude for life. After 22 years Lee's innocence was proved and he was released with £7000 of compensation. The piece went on:

Judging from the bill of The Man They Could Not Hang the third act is amusingly gruesome. Scene four introduces a Vision in the condemned cell, and Scene five is “The Scaffold. The Trap refuses to Work. Saved by a Miracle. The Almighty Power.” In the actual case of John Lee's remarkable let-off the hangman hadn't previously oiled the gallows fixings. He was a lazy and perfunctory Ketch [hangman]. Hence the marvel.

Another newspaper wrote, "A somewhat gruesome title this, and one which however attractive to a large number of people would probably impel others by a suggestion of horror. Let us hasten to say there is nothing repulsive in the play — but plenty of thrill of intense dramatic action, interspersed with comedy."

== Characters ==
- John Lee
- Fred Masterville, the villain
- Rev. Denton
- Mr. Lee, senior
- Sergeant Clarke
- Jim Wells,
- Dicky Dood, Lee's shipmate in the navy
- Miss Cleveden
- Mrs. Lee
- Polly Meek, Dicky's sweetheart
- Kate Murton, Lee's sweetheart
- Isadore Carter, who exposes Masterville
