= J. A. Lipman =

Australian filmmaker (1877 – 1958)

Jonas Alfred Lipman (25 April 1877 – 18 March 1958), frequently referred to as "Joe", was an Australian philanthropist, actor, producer and director of theatre and film. He was described as "a colourful extrovert" with "a flair for the wheeling and dealing of the film trade".

== History ==
Lipman was born in South Australia, the son of Judah Moss Lipman (c. 1852 – 7 July 1911) married Sylvia Selina Hyams (died 24 August 1918) on 9 March 1881. He was educated at Prince Alfred College. As a young man, Lipman was active in Jewish artistic circles, performing in and directing plays. He left Adelaide in March or April 1903 for Western Australia, initially for a matter of months, then more permanently, to manage his father's business interests in Coolgardie. In that prosperous gold-mining town Lipman was active in theatre, partly in connection with the local branch of the Australian Natives' Association.

His father was the most prominent businessman in the town, and perhaps the wealthiest; Judah Lipman ( – 7 July 1911), owner of the Cremorne, the Grand Hotel, the Brewery and much else beside. Judah's youngest brother Abraham, also known as Alfred, managed the Halfway House, then the Grand Hotel for brother Judah, died of pneumonia at Coolgardie in 1897. Judah was a son of Jonas Lipman (c. 1835 – 21 January 1880) and Hannah Lipman of Port Adelaide.

Lipman left Western Australia in July 1905, announcing his intention of joining a troupe touring India.

By 1909, he had returned to Adelaide, where he was involved as actor and director with an amateur theatre group, The Actors' Club. A noted performance was One Summers Day (Henry V. Esmond) held at the Unley Town Hall in July 1910 in aid of the St Paul's choir fund. This was followed in September by The Dilemma at the same venue. Following these two successes, The Players staged Charley's Aunt over two nights at the Theatre Royal in December and revived in June 1911 at the Unley Town Hall. In each of these Lipman was both stage director and leading man to packed houses and critical acclaim.

By 1914, he had moved to Victoria, working as stage manager and director for the Comedy Theatre at the refurbished Daylight Pictures Co. building on the Lower Esplanade, St Kilda, adjacent the Palais de Danse. The first productions, changed weekly, were: The New Baby (Arthur Bourchier); Our Girls (H. J. Byron) and The Three Hats (aka Three Hats Slightly Mixed and similar), an adaptation of a farce by Alfred Hennequin. The Comedy Theatre, a summer favorite, did not survive beyond March 1915. In 1916 and 1917 Lipman made several buying trips to the United States, and reported on the rise of Broadway.

He wrote Just Peggy while in the USA. signed the lead actress, Sara Allgood, having seen her perform on stage in J. Hartley Manners' comedy Peg o' My Heart, and filmed it in Sydney. His best known film is probably Mystery Island (1937).

Some of his stage and film work is credited to his pseudonym, Rigby C. Tearle.

Lipman was head of several Australian motion picture distribution and exhibition companies, particularly of British films, from the late 1910s to the early 1930s. In 1918, as head of Quality Features he picked up a film Damaged Goods on the theme of venereal disease. In 1920, when it was playing at the Princess Theatre, Melbourne, he was fined for showing the movie, judged as obscene. The same year he helped established the company United Shows Inc. Three years later he helped set up the Australian Releasing Corporation. and Australasian Films Ltd. He also represented British International Pictures Ltd from around 1929. Lipman managed to achieve a great deal of success in his lifetime through his many business and personal affiliations- at one point he was reported to have purchased the rights to Charlie Chaplin for £1,000,000. His close friend and mentor was Harry Warner, of Warner Bros fame.

== Personal life ==
He married Gertrude Solomon, a descendent of Samuel Moss Solomon in 1917.

Gertrude and Joe had two children, Robert Alfred and Judith Sylvia.

He died in Strathfield, New South Wales in March 1958. His widow died four months later.

== Select credits ==
- Just Peggy (1918) – writer, producer, director
- The Man They Could Not Hang (1934) – producer
- Mystery Island (1937) – writer, director
