= Joseph Luker =

Murdered Australian police officer

- Born: c. 1765
- Died: 26 August 1803 (aged 37–38); Sydney, Colony of New South Wales
- Cause of death: Bludgeoned to death
- Occupation: Police constable
- Years active: 1796–1803
- Spouse: Ann Chapman (m. 1797–1803)

Joseph Luker (c. 1765 – 26 August 1803) (also spelt Lucar and Looker) was a British convict transported to the Colony of New South Wales on the 12-gun sailing ship Atlantic as part of the Third Fleet. After the completion of his sentence he joined the fledgling police force of the colony. On the evening of 25/26 August 1803, while investigating a robbery he was beaten to death, becoming the first police officer killed in the line of duty in Australia. Even though some of his colleagues were implicated in his death no one was ever convicted of his murder.

== Transportation ==
Luker and an accomplice James Roche, on 23 June 1789, were apprehended with 84 pounds of lead, worth 10 shillings (equivalent to £66.06 in 2025), that had been removed from the guttering of the house of George Dowling in Mile End New Town, England. A witness, Simeon Wood, said that the prisoners had carried away the lead on their shoulders and tipped it down a hole into an empty house. When approached, Luker had threatened Simeon with an unopened pocket knife.

Luker and Roche separately attempted to create a joint alibi, but their stories did not concur. Roche said they met in Spicer Street on their way to work, and Luker said they met in Lamb Alley and went for a beer. The prisoners appeared before the court of the Old Bailey in London on 8 July, where they were found guilty and sentenced to 7 years' transportation.

On 27 March 1791, Luker departed from Portsmouth, England, aboard the 12-gun sailing ship Atlantic, part of the Third Fleet. She was transporting 220 convicts of which 18 died on the passage, and arrived in Australia on 20 August 1791. His sentence expired in 1796 and Luker as an emancipist joined the Night Watch, a fledgling police force, which was replaced by the Sydney Foot Police. He married Ann Chapman at Parramatta in 1797.

== Murder of Constable Luker ==
On the evening of 25 August 1803, Mary Breeze's brothel was robbed, the thieves getting away with a portable desk, containing legal documents and 24 guineas (equivalent to £2,239.78 in 2025), this being only one of a number of robberies that had taken place in the area. Breeze reported the theft to Constable Luker, who lived on the same street as Breeze's establishment. Luker told Breeze that he believed he knew who was involved, and that he would investigate once his patrol started at midnight.

Luker's body was found before dawn on 26 August 1803, behind Breeze's establishment at Back Row East (now Phillip Street, Sydney). He had received sixteen wounds to the head; the guard of his own weapon was embedded in his skull. Found near his body was the wheel of a barrow and Mrs Breeze's desk, both covered in blood.

Surgeon John Harris of the New South Wales Corps took custody of the body in order to carry out the inquest. Harris concluded that at least four weapons had been used, three of which were identified: the desk and wheel as well as Luker's own cutlass. He concluded that for the guard of the weapon to be embedded so far into his skull, it would necessarily have been swung by an assailant who was holding the blade.

== Investigation and trial ==
Luker had implicated his fellow constable Isaac Simmonds in the robbery, when talking with Breeze during the evening before he died. Simmonds was quickly apprehended, and bloodstained clothes were found in his room. A witness had also recognised him earlier, while he was trying to clean blood off the desk. An associate of Simmonds and Luker, Constable William Bladders, was also found with bloodstained clothes, and the bloodied frame of a barrow was found in the yard opposite his lodgings.

Another constable, John Russell, was implicated in the robbery. Joseph Samuel (also known as Samuels) and Richard Jackson also were apprehended for their involvement in the crime. Simmonds and Bladders were charged with wilful murder. Simmonds was acquitted at trial for insufficient evidence after convincing the court that the bloodstains on the clothes were caused by his regular nosebleeds. Bladders was also acquitted, after convincing the court that the blood had come from his earlier slaughter of a pig.

The inquest took five hours to return the verdict. Russell, Samuel and Jackson were charged with breaking and entering. Russell was acquitted on insufficient evidence. Jackson admitted the robbery and turned state's evidence against Samuel. Samuel pleaded guilty to the robbery but denied any involvement in the death of Luker. Samuel was found guilty of breaking and entering; he was sentenced to be hanged.

Samuel was scheduled to be executed on 26 September 1803. When asked for any last words, he again claimed his innocence of Luker's murder and accused Simmonds. He said that while they were in a cell awaiting trial, Simmonds had claimed responsibility and that the conversation was in Hebrew. There were three failed attempts to hang Samuel: twice the rope snapped and once it unravelled. This was followed by a "public clamour", and within an hour of that response Governor King claimed divine intervention and commuted his sentence to life imprisonment. Samuel was eventually sent to work in the coal mines at King's Town (modern day Newcastle). According to Rachel Franks, the narrative of the events that is most commonly told is that of Samuel, the man they could not hang, not of Luker. Franks believes that the only reason Luker is mentioned in these narratives at all is because he was the first officer of the law to be killed in the line of duty in Australia.

== Burial and memorials ==
Luker was interred at the Old Sydney Burial Ground on the 28 August 1803. The procession was followed by all members of the constabulary, with four constables as pallbearers including Simmonds. A gravestone, engraved with a skull and bones and a cutlass, was placed later that year; it was 4 feet (1.2 metres) high. The epitaph was transcribed in the Sydney Gazette on 6 November 1803:

Sacred to the Memory of Joseph Luker, Constable;

Assassinated

Aug 19, 1803, Aged 35 Years

Resurrexit in Deo

My midnight’s Vigils are no more,

Cold Sleep and Peace succeed

The Pangs of Death are past and o’er,

My Wounds no longer bleed.

But when my murderers appear

Before Jehovah’s Throne,

Mine will it be to vanquish there

And theirs t’endure alone.

As the headstone no longer exists it is unknown whether the incorrect date of death (19 August 1803) was etched onto the headstone or whether it was just an error in the newspaper's transcription. With the construction of Sydney Town Hall at the site of the Old Sydney Burial Ground in 1869, bodies were removed and reinterred at Rookwood Cemetery. Luker and two other policemen were among these bodies.

In the 1980s and 1990s police associations sought to establish a memorial to police officers killed in the line of duty. The National Police Memorial at King's Park in Canberra, was launched on National Police Remembrance Day, 29 September 2006. Constable Joseph Luker is the first name on the memorial wall at the National Police Memorial.
