= American privateer Warrior =

History

United States
- Name: Warrior
- Builder: Adam and Noah Brown

General characteristics
- Class & type: Brig
- Tons burthen: 430 (bm)
- Propulsion: Sail
- Complement: 150 men
- Armament: 21 guns

Warrior was an American privateer.

Under the command of Guy Champlin, Warrior captured the brig Hope, the 4-gun convict transport Francis and Eliza in January 1815, the 8-gun Neptune, the brig Dundee, and an unknown schooner.
