= Minorca (1799 ship) =

British merchant ship

History

Great Britain
- Name: Minorca
- Namesake: Minorca
- Builder: Thomas Hearn, Lowlights, Newcastle upon Tyne, or; Francis Hurry & Co, North Shields
- Launched: 12 October 1799
- Fate: Last listed in Lloyd's Register in 1810

General characteristics
- Tons burthen: 407, or 40721/94 (bm)
- Propulsion: Sail
- Complement: 32
- Armament: 1801: 2 × 6-pounder guns + 8 × 18-pounder carronades; 1804: 2 × 6-pounder guns + 6 × 18-pounder carronades; 1806: 8 × 18-pounder carronades

Minorca was a merchant ship launched in 1799 at Newcastle upon Tyne, England. She made one voyage in 1801 transporting convicts to New South Wales. For her return voyage to Britain she was under contract to the British East India Company (EIC).

== Convict and EIC voyage (1801-1803) ==
Captain John Leith acquired a letter of marque on 22 April 1801. He sailed from Spithead, England on 21 June 1801 in convoy with Canada and Nile, and reached Rio de Janeiro on 29 August. All three vessels arrived at Port Jackson on 14 December 1801. The next day Minorca was at Sydney Cove. Minorca had left with 104 male convicts, of whom two died during the voyage. The fate of three others is unclear.

Minorca left Port Jackson on 6 February 1802 bound for China. By 28 April 1802 Minorca was at Whampoa.

For her homeward voyage she reached Macao on 26 May, in company with True Briton, Canada, and Nile. True Briton quickly parted from the others, and Canada had to put back leaky.

Minorca was Amboina on 5 August, the Cape on 2 November, and St Helena on 1 December. She arrived at the Downs on 10 February 1803.

== Subsequent career ==
In 1803 her owners sold Minorca to Reeve & Co. Lloyd's Register for 1804 reports that Minorca's master was J. Sunter, her owner Reeve & Co., and her trade Plymouth to Cork. That entry continued unchanged through 1810.

The 1804 volume of the Register of Shipping lists her master as Sanster, her owner as F. Hurry, and her trade as London transport. She is last listed in the Register of Shipping in 1806 with Parks, master, Reeves & Co., owners, and trade: London transport.

On 9 November 1805 Minorca put into Charleston in distress, but whether she sailed again afterwards is not clear.

She had left on 28 October under the command of Captain Wood, in company with Esther, Ariel, and a schooner, all under the escort of HMS Peterell. However, Minorca developed leaks and turned back, joined soon after by Esther, which too had developed leaks. They arrived at the Charleston bar on 3 November and took on board pilots, who informed them of the presence of the French privateer Creole. The privateer appeared and approached the two British ships. Minorca succeeded in getting into Charleston, but an engagement developed between Esther and the privateer. Both suffered extensive losses before Esther struck her colours. The men from the privateer then proceeded to murder her captain and a number of her crew before taking her into St. Marys, Georgia, on 11 November.
