= Palais de Danse, St Kilda =

Former dance hall in St Kilda, Melbourne, Australia

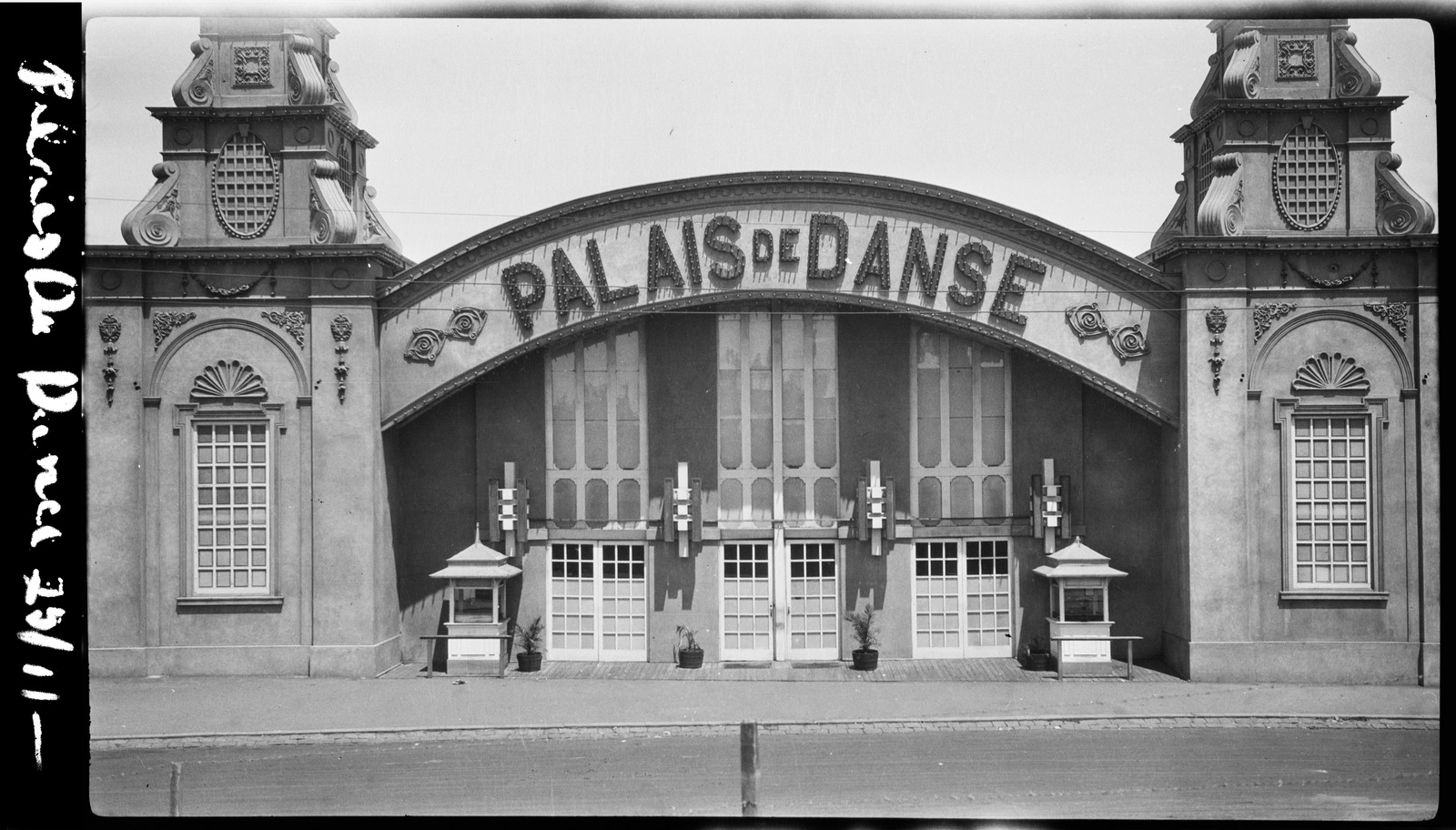
- Palais de Danse c1930
- Interactive map of Palais de Danse, St Kilda
- Address: Lower Esplanade, St Kilda
- Coordinates: 37°52′02″S 144°58′32″E

Construction
- Opened: 1920
- Demolished: 1969
- Architect: Walter Burley Griffin (interior)

The Palais de Danse was a large dance hall located next to the Palais Theatre in the entertainment precinct of the foreshore of St Kilda, a beachside inner suburb of Melbourne, Victoria, Australia. Built in 1919, it featured a remarkable geometric interior created in 1920 by the renowned architects Walter Burley Griffin and his wife, Marion Griffin (1871–1961), and it was a popular entertainment venue throughout the early 20th century. The building was destroyed by fire in 1969.

== History ==
The site of the current 1927 Palais Theatre, and the site adjacent, on the Lower Esplanade St Kilda, hosted a succession of four different buildings using the name Palais between 1913 and 1927, all built by the Phillips brothers.

The first was the Palais de Danse, a timber, arched roofed structure built in 1913 on the site later occupied by the Palais Theatre. In 1915, during WW1, management thought it more appropriate to show films instead, when it became the first Palais Theatre. This proved such a very popular choice that in 1919 it was decided to replace the auditorium with a much larger building. This was constructed as a large steel-framed arched structure over the top of the original, allowing the movies to continue uninterrupted.

On completion of the new structure, the earlier building was disassembled except for the first bay containing the foyer, which was then relocated next door to become the Palais de Danse (again), while the new larger arched building became the Palais Pictures. The Palais Pictures building was destroyed by fire in 1926, and rebuilt in 1927, the present Palais Theatre.

The Palais de Danse could hold as many as 2,870 patrons, and was a popular venue throughout its life, and is remembered for its magical atmosphere. On hot nights, the louvered wall panels hinged up, to capture sea breezes wafting off the bay.

An extension to the rear c1962 created a second venue called the Stardust Lounge. The whole building was destroyed by fire in 1969, and a new entertainment venue opened on the site in 1972, called The Palace, which itself was also destroyed by fire in 2007.

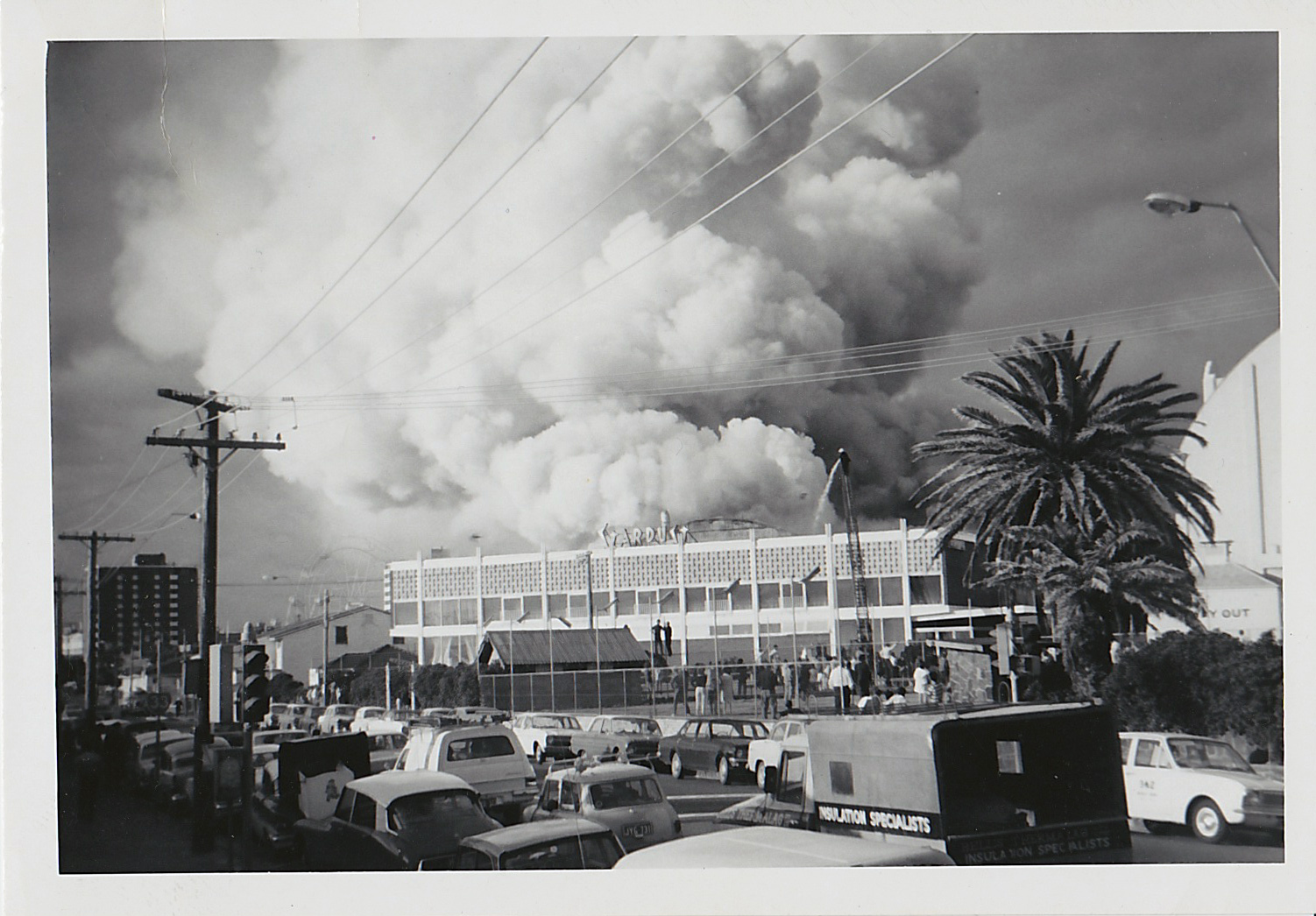
1969 fire seen from behind

There was another entertainment structure nearby that also used the name Palais - the Wattle Path Palais de Danse on the Upper Esplanade, which opened in 1923 and operated until 1933, when it was converted into film studios, later becoming the St Moritz Ice Rink. Also located on the Lower Esplanade was the Daylight Pictures Co. open-air cinema, which in 1914 was converted to a live venue, the Comedy Theatre, but appears to have had a brief life.

== Architecture ==
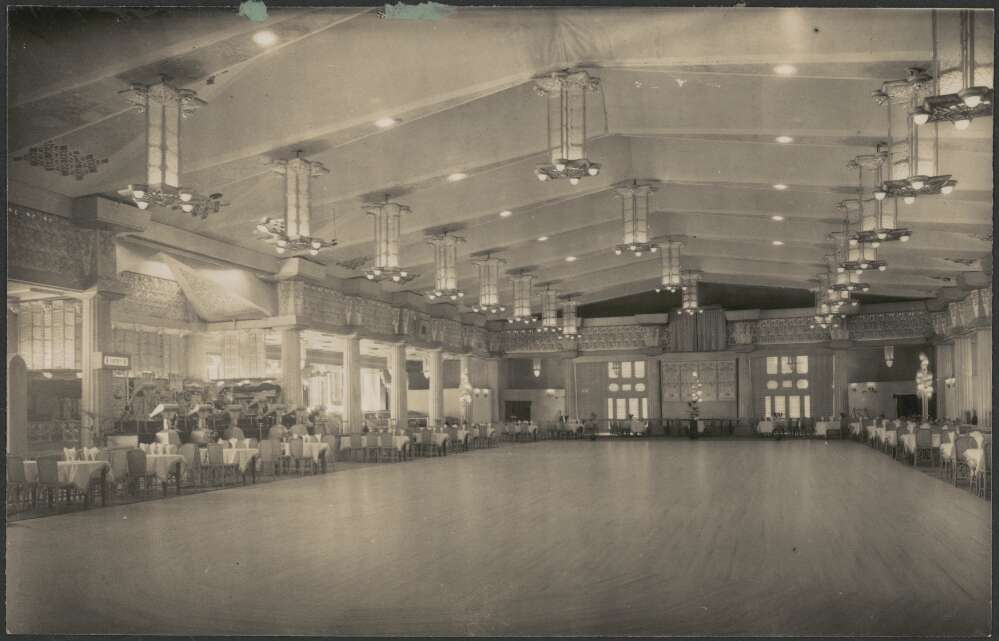
Palais de Danse interior c1920

The 1919 Palais de Danse exterior (designer unknown) was dominated by a large arched form following that of the roof, anchored by large square piers each side, decorated with delicate classical details, and topped by fanciful stepped turrets.

The interior design created c1920 was designed by the renowned American-Australian architect Walter Burley Griffin (1876–1937) and his wife, Marion Griffin (1871–1961). The dance floor was surrounded by seating areas behind abstracted fluted Doric columns, which supported a remarkable frieze of complex, prismatic, up-lit panels. The ceiling, at first just the exposed metal trusses of the roof, was soon concealed by low pitched angled ribbing, from which hung three rows of large geometrically decorated prismatic lamps.
