= Nile (1799 ship) =

History

Great Britain
- Name: Nile
- Namesake: Battle of the Nile (1798)
- Owner: 12/02/1799:Francis & Thomas Hurry, of Howden Dock, Wall's End, Northumberland; 26/07/1803:Joshua Reeves & Mr Green, Southwark, London; registered at London
- Builder: Edward Mosley & Co, Howdon
- Launched: 1798
- Fate: Stranded and wrecked 22 November 1833

General characteristics
- Tons burthen: 322, or 323 (bm)
- Propulsion: Sail
- Complement: 24
- Armament: 8 × 6- & 4-pounder guns + 2 × 12-pounder carronades

Nile was a sailing ship built in 1799 at Howden, England. She made one voyage transporting convicts to New South Wales. For her return trip to Britain she was under contract to the British East India Company (EIC). Thereafter she traded between London and the West Indies, Canada, and the Mediterranean until she stranded on 22 November 1833 on the island of Oesel, Russia.

== Career ==
Nile first appeared in Lloyd's Register (LR) in 1801 with John Sunter, master, Hurry & Co., owner, and trade London–Botany Bay.

Captain James Sunter (or James Souter) received a letter of marque on 22 April 1801. He left Portsmouth, England, on 21 June 1801, with 96 female convicts, four children, ten male passengers, nine female passengers and 21 children.

Nile traveled in convoy with Canada and Minorca, and reached Rio de Janeiro on 26 August; all three arrived at Port Jackson on 14 December. None of Nile's convicts died on the voyage.

Nile left Port Jackson on 6 February 1802 bound for China. She arrived at Whampoa on 27 April 1802.

Homeward bound, she passed Lintin Island on 24 May, reached Amboina on 5 August, the Cape on 3 November, and St Helena on 1 December. She arrived at the Downs on 14 February 1803.

In 1803 Lloyd's Register showed her trade changing from London-Botany Bay to London-Baltic. In 1804 "Gibson" became master, and the next year she traded between Cork and Jamaica. Lloyd's Register for 1806 shows her master as "Sterling", her owners as "Faith & Co.", her armament as six 6-pounder guns, and her trade as London-Jamaica. Two years later her master is "Parker", and her trade is London-Halifax. The entries remain unchanged until 1812, when her trade becomes London-Malta. By 1818 her master is "J. Park", her owners are "Reeve & Co.", and her trade is Liverpool-Jamaica, and later London-Jamaica. In 1820 her trade is Liverpool-Canada. In 1821 and 1822 she is listed as being at London. Then in 1823 her owner and master are "R. Story", and her trade is Liverpool-Nova Scotia. The next year master and owner are "R. Storey", and the trade is Hull-Pictou. In 1825 her trade is Hull-Shields. In 1826 owner and master are "A. Storey", and Nile's trade is London-Dantzig. The entries continue unchanged until 1831, when her trade becomes Plymouth-N.America.

== Fate ==
Nile, Storer (per The Times), or Storey (per Lloyd's List), master, stranded on 22 November 1833 on the Oesel. Nile was no longer listed in Lloyd's Register in 1834.
