= The Man They Could Not Hang (book) =

Non-fiction book

- Author: Mike Holgate, Ian David Waugh
- Publication date: 2005
- ISBN: 9780750936521

The Man They Could Not Hang is the title of two different non-fiction books about the life story of John 'Babbacombe' Lee, the butler who was convicted of the murder of Emma Keyse, his elderly employer in 1907. The title refers to the legendary fact that the attempts to execute John Lee by hanging had failed three times. The first book was written by John Lee, and published in 1908, the second was published in 2005.

== 1908 book ==
The 1908 book is by John Lee but with embellished autobiographical details.

== 2005 book ==
The 2005 book was researched and written by Mike Holgate and Ian David Waugh, who managed to update some of the mysteries surrounding the 1884 murder, most notably John Lee's apparent disappearance after his release.
