= The Girl from Outback =

The Girl From Outback
- Production company: Australian Life Biograph Company
- Release date: December 1911
- Running time: 3,000 feet
- Country: Australia
- Languages: Silent film English intertitles

The Girl From Outback is a 1911 Australian film. It was called "a thrilling story of real Australian bush life". It starred "actors and actresses who are experts in their art."

It is a lost film.
