= Anton Mazzanovich =

Dalmatian-American soldier and Wild West story writer (1860–1934)

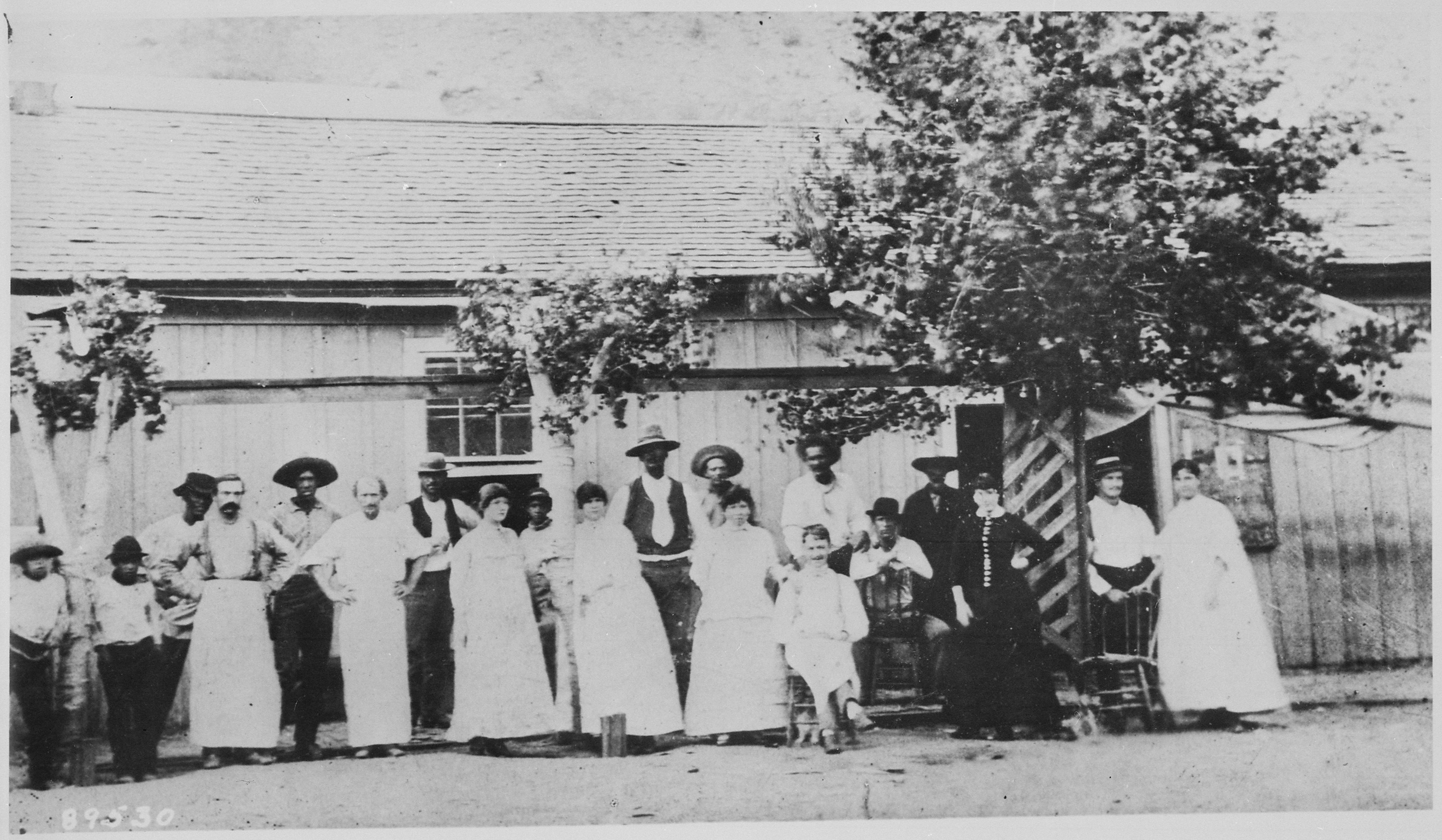
Photograph shows customers and staff at Hovey's Dance Hall in Clifton, Arizona, in 1884. The author Anton Mazzanovich is standing next to the tree at right.

Anton Mazzanovich Anglicized from Antonije Mašanović (1860–1934) was a Dalmatian-American soldier and author of real stories of the Wild West. Mazzanovich's work is from a perspective of a participant, an eyewitness and a connoisseur of the Wild West, having personal knowledge of the individuals he met and wrote about. Mazzanovich's books can be classified as historical narratives or memoirs as opposed to short story fiction or novels. The Mazzanovich papers are archived at the Arizona Historical Society, South Arizona Division in Tucson, Arizona.

== Biography ==
Anton Mazzanovich was born in Lesina, then part of Austria-Hungary now Hvar, Croatia. The population of his homeland was steadily declining as the youth was forced into the military to fight in foreign wars and the young Mazzanovich family decided to emigrate from Habsburg Austria to the United States in 1868. After running away from home, he enlisted in the U.S. Army without his parents' knowledge when he was not yet in his teens but his father was able to return him home once he found where Anton was stationed. Anton eventually got his way and joined the famed U.S. 6th Cavalry and was posted at Fort Lowell in Tucson in 1881. He was a participant in the Apache Wars. His career in the military enriched him with so many experiences that he later wrote about them in books. He wrote about Gold Rush Postal Inspector John Clum whom he had known in Arizona while in the military and other well-known people from out West such as Geronimo, Tom Horn, Wyatt Earp, Doc Holliday, Judge Hamilton Calhoun McComas, Kate Elder, Billy the Kid and others

He also had a stint as an actor in very early Hollywood silent films in 1918. His younger brother Max was a stage designer implicated in a Chicago 1902 theatre fire, and another brother, Lawrence (Mazzanovich) was a well-known American artist.

Anton Mazzanovich was married to Caroline G. Minet.

He died on July 31, 1934, and was buried in Arizona.

== Works ==
- Tracking Geronimo (1923)
- The Truth About Tom Horne
- Killing of Judge and Mrs. McComas
- Story of a Medicine Man's Medal
- Geronimo Campaign
- A Snipe Hunt in Arizona
- When the Comet Hit Tucson in 1881
- Letter of John P. Clum
- Lieutenant Charles B. Gatewood
- The Southwest Frontier

== Literature ==
- Chris Enss: "According to Kate: The Legendary Life of Big Nose Kate"
- Peter Cozzens: "Eyewitness to the Indian Wars, 1865–1890"
- Chris Cozzone, Jim Boggio: "Boxing in New Mexico, 1868–1940"
- David Grassé: "The Bisbee Massacre: Murder and retribution in the Arizona Territory"
- Ramon Frederick Adams: "Six-Guns and Saddle Leather"
