= Canada (1800 ship) =

British merchant ship and convict transport (1800–1832)

History

Great Britain
- Name: Canada
- Owner: F. Hurry & Co., Newcastle on Tyne; Reeve & Co. after 1803
- Builder: Francis Hurry & Co.
- Launched: 1800
- Fate: Disappears from Lloyd's Register after 1832

General characteristics
- Tons burthen: 393, or 403, (bm)
- Propulsion: Sail
- Complement: 21
- Armament: 2 × 6-pounder guns + 8 × 18-pounder carronades; after 1806 the number of her carronades increased to 10

Canada was a merchant ship launched at Shields in 1800. She made five trips transporting convicts to Australia. On two of those trips she was also under charter to the British East India Company (EIC). When she was not transporting convicts Canada traded with the West Indies, and with Canada until c.1832.

== Voyages ==
Canada's first voyage took place during the French Revolutionary Wars. Captain William Wilkinson, or her owner, chose to acquire a letter of marque, which was issued to him on 22 April 1801. On Canada's first voyage transporting convicts she was under charter to the EIC. Canada sailed from Spithead on 21 June 1801. She travelled in convoy with Minorca and Nile, and reached Rio de Janeiro on 28 August. All three vessels arrived at Port Jackson on 14 December 1801. Canada had embarked 104 male convicts of whom three died during the voyage.

Canada left Port Jackson on 6 February 1802 bound for China. She arrived at Whampoa on 28 April 1802.

On her homeward bound voyage she crossed the Second Bar, which lies about 20 miles before Whampoa, on 22 May. From there she reached Timor on 4 October and St Helena on 22 December. She arrived at Long Reach on 8 March 1803.

On her return to Britain, Canada received a new owner, Reeve & Co., a new master, W. Gray, and a new role, sailing as a general transport based in London. In 1806 she received a new master, Park, and a new trade, London-Jamaica. This description in Lloyd's Register remained unchanged even after she got a new master and again sailed to Australia.

Seven years had passed before Canada again carried convicts to Australia. John Ward sailed her from Sheerness on 23 March 1810, and she arrived at Port Jackson on 8 September. Of the 122 female convicts she carried, only one died on the voyage.<

Canada left Port Jackson on 12 November 1810 bound for China. For her voyage from China Canada was again under contract to the EIC. She was at Bocca Tigris, the estuary of the Pearl River, on 25 February 1811. She reached Macao on 25 March and left there on 2 April. From Macao she reached St Helena on 23 July and arrived at Long Reach on 2 October.

Lloyd's Register for 1812 showed Canada with M. Graves, master, and her trade as London-Jamaica again. The next year her trade was London-Quebec.

In 1813, the British East India Company (EIC) had lost its monopoly on the trade between India and Britain. British ships were then free to sail to India or the Indian Ocean under a licence from the EIC. Canada's owners applied for a licence on 21 July 1814, and received the licence that day.

Under the command of John Grigg, on her third convict voyage, she sailed from Cork on 5 December 1814, and arrived at Port Jackson on 5 August 1815. On the way she stopped at Sierra Leone where she joined Francis and Eliza and the two sailed together to Cape Town, arriving on 12 May. They stayed there for some three weeks before sailing together for New South Wales. Canada had embarked 160 male convicts, four of whom died on the voyage. Canada left Port Jackson on 25 October 1815 bound for Batavia.

Again under Grigg's command, Canada on her fourth convict voyage sailed from Cork on 21 March 1817 and arrived at Port Jackson on 6 August. She carried 89 female convicts, all of whom survived the voyage.

Canada left Port Jackson on 24 October 1817 bound for Batavia.

Under the command of Alexander Spain, on her fifth convict voyage, she sailed from London on 23 April 1819 and arrived at Port Jackson on 1 September. She carried 135 male convicts, two of whom died on the voyage.

== Fate ==
Lloyd's Register for 1821 still showed Spain as Canada's master, and her trade as London-Botany Bay. In 1822 she reportedly had a new master, T. Cohlson, and a new trade, London—St John. Lloyd's Register for 1823 gives her master as T. Coulson, her owner as G. (or "C.") Smith, and her trade as Liverpool-New Brunswick. It also gives her burthen as 393 (bm). The next year her master becomes J. Redpert. By 1826, her master's name has been corrected to J. Redpeth, and her trade was again London—Quebec. She last appears in Lloyd's Register is in 1832.
