= The Life Story of John Lee, or The Man They Could Not Hang (1921 film) =

1921 film

- Everyone's 30 May 1923
- Directed by: Arthur W. Sterry
- Written by: Arthur W. Sterry
- Produced by: Arthur W. Sterry; Frederick Haldane
- Starring: Rose Rooney
- Cinematography: Tasman Higgins
- Production companies: Sterry and Haldane
- Release date: 24 December 1921
- Running time: six reels
- Country: Australia
- Languages: Silent film English intertitles
- Box office: £27,000

The Life Story of John Lee, or the Man They Could Not Hang is a 1921 Australian silent film based on the true life story of John "Babbacombe Lee. It is a remake of a 1912 film with some extra scenes of Lee's childhood.

Unlike many silent Australian films, a copy of the movie exists.

In 1927 novelist Arthur Wright declared in a piece on the Australian industry that "a picture which perhaps cost the least of all, had no Australian interest, is reputed to have proved the most profitable, and that is, be it recorded with sorrow, The Man They Could not Hang."

== Plot ==
John Lee grows up in England and is falsely accused of the murder of Emma Keye at Babbacombe. Characters include his parents; Miss Key's employer, Ned Saw; Eliza Harris and Jane, servants of Miss Keye; Kate Farmer, Lee's sweetheart.

He is sentenced to be executed but the executions fail three times. Eventually, Lee is set free and is reunited with his mother and sweetheart at home.

== Cast ==
- Carlton Max as John Lee
- Kate Rooney

== Production ==
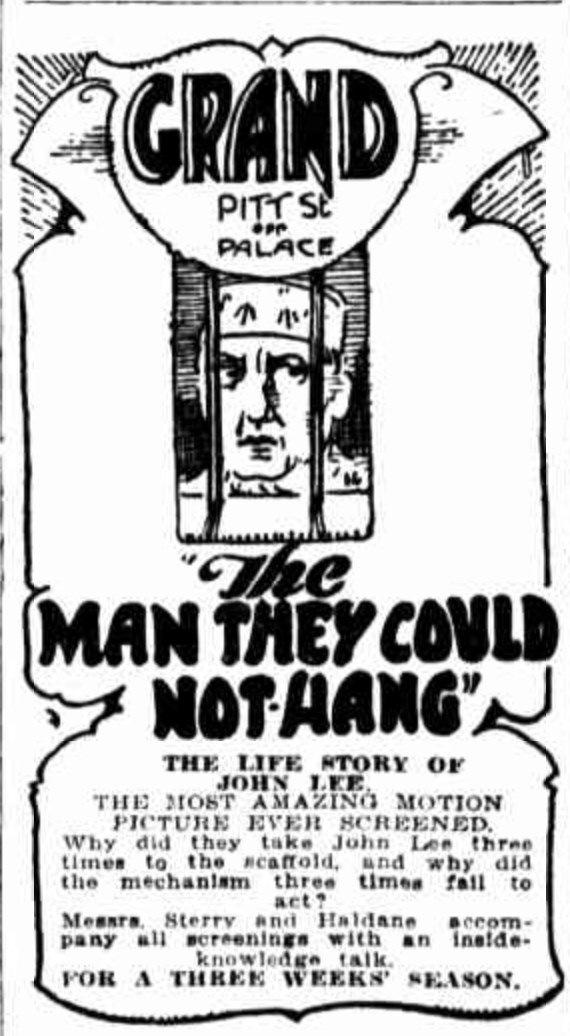
Sydney Sun 29 December 1921

Sterry and Haldane enjoyed enormous success with the 1912 version of this story, and a 1919 article in The Bulletin claims they shot some additional footage for this.

They decided to remake it entirely, adding more scenes of Lee's childhood and extra piety. The film was reportedly financed by three New Zealande businessmen.

In August 1921 it was announced Carlton Max, the ventriloquist, signed to play the title role. Kate Rooney, the female lead, was from vaudeville.

A prologue was shot involving Mrs. Lee's cottage and John Lee's cell, enacted by Louise Parndon and George Frederick.

== Copyright applications ==
Charles Ernest Phillips registered the Philip Lytton play for copyright in July 1920.

It was registered for copyright on 8 September 1921.

Sterry registered a play for copyright in 1927 called The Life Story of John Lee or The Babbacombe Tragedy.

== Reception ==
Everyones 5 April 1922

Sydney Sun 7 May 1922

=== Critical ===
Everyone's magazine said:

The original film having outlived its usefulness, so far as quality goes, a new cast has been secured for the present screening. The present company do well enough with this very melodramatic story, which, to say the most of, is a story most flimsily constructed, and lacking in many essentials. But the title carries a punch, and there is enough morbid interest in the theme to assure for it a wide measure of patronage. The captious critic, reviewing the film from the angle of what is anticipated in a production, will have something to think over. But the answer is in the box-office, and this, after all is what the exhibitor wants to hear. It is a safe bet that stories of the Man They Could Not Hang type will pull business, when the finest picture ever reeled would flop.

Triad magazine called it:

An Australian production which looks like an old picture taken off the shelf and gently dusted. The hero, Mr. Carlton Max, played with great conviction throughout the whole play. His father, whose name does not appear, also acted well, and did some fine work in several scenes. The other characters were simple, but all suitable to the long and intricate plot...The various sea effects were well done, and the titles adapted from the Ballad of Reading Jail were suitable and well adapted. The photography was patchy in parts, but the general effect, even for an old film, was good.

In September 1922 The Bulletin reported:

The Man They Could Not Hang. that made-in-Australia bugaboo picture which has been horrifying the back-blocks for a year or more, got as far out as Bobbra Wobbra last week, and all the elite of the district lined up to be thrilled. The picture made a profound impression. Even the peroxided pianist was captivated, and gazed with starting eyes at the screen as she churned out appropriate jazz music. When it came to the dread ordeal of the unhappy John Lee, who stood on the drop with the cap over his eyes, waiting to he jerked into Eternity, the audience held its breath in expectation of the sickening thud. Just then the inspired but enthralled piano-lady dashed off into "We don't want to lose you, But we think you ought to go." And the tension was relieved.

One audience remember later recalled, "The film was highly moral, demonstrating that right was right, justice could not go awry and Divine intervention was an innocent man's guarantee that he would not be hanged."

=== Box office ===
The movie proved very popular at the box office. Sterry and Haldane would often appear at screenings, delivering an oration. The Sydney Sun thought "The success of this picture is due in a measure, perhaps, to the eliminating of gruesome details, and certainly to the accompanying talks by Messrs. Haldane and Sterry."

In May 1922 Everyone's called it "a remarkable draw everywhere, capable of converting any week night into a Saturday, as can be vouched for by those showmen who have handled it."

In March 1923 the film was called "a big money-spinner through most of Australia during the past fifteen months." In June it was reported Sterry "had cleaned up everywhere with The Man They Could Not Hang... financially, but since his departure Mr. Mervyn Barrington has received many applications from suburban and country exhibitors, all anxious to obtain this picture. In fact, three managers have re-booked it for the second time; something rather unusual for an Australian production."

== Overseas release ==
Haldane also toured the English speaking world showing this film and providing the oration that accompanied it. Truth wrote in September 1922 when Haldene left overseas that "perhaps, in hewing a path through, what has always proved in the past a jungle of opposition, Mr. Haldane will make easier the way of producers from this country, who may well expect the same treatment of their offerings in other countries as Is usually accorded the importations to this."

In September 1922 Haldane took a copy of the film to South Africa. However, the film was banned there. According to The Bulletin in May 1923:

Six months ago Hugh D. Wilson... left for South Africa with the calamitous made-in-Australia film, The Man They Could Not Hang. They reached Jo’burg just when the leaders of the Red Rebellion were about to be executed. Owing to the electrical atmosphere prevailing, the authorities intervened, and The Man wasn't permitted, to hang or flicker either. Wilson and Haldane moved on to England, and have since been working steadily through the U.K. with the celluloid catastrophe. The Man They Could Not Hang is at present advertising Australia in Wales. What's the use of having a cinematograph censorship if films like this unpleasant thing are not only suffered to be made and exhibited here, but are allowed to go forth to the ends of the earth?

In August 1924 an Everyone's correspondent in London wrote "this picture has even been a bigger success than it was in Australia; so much for the morbid taste of the present-day patron." In November 1924 Wilson was in Canada and Everyone's said the film "is proving one of the biggest successes in the film world." By April 1925 it was reported the film had played in Canada, Britain and New Zealand. In 1926 Everyones reported the film had been playing in Britain for several years. In 1928 the film was still screening in New Zealand.

Haldene said he toured with the film to England, Ireland, Scotland, Wales and Canada. He also met Lees mother and sister and showed them the film.
