= The Life Story of John Lee, or The Man They Could Not Hang (1912 film) =

- The Sun 12 Sept 1917
- Directed by: Robert Scott
- Written by: Philip Lytton
- Based on: play The Man They Could Not Hang by Claude Murrell (or Frank Davenport)
- Produced by: Philip Lytton
- Starring: Mervyn Barrington
- Cinematography: Herbert Finlay
- Distributed by: Arthur W. Sterry and Frederick Haldane (1917 onwards)
- Release date: 26 October 1912
- Running time: four reels or 3,500 feet
- Country: Australia
- Languages: Silent film English intertitles
- Budget: £300
- Box office: £50,000 or £20,000

The Life Story of John Lee, or the Man They Could Not Hang is a 1912 Australian silent film based on a stage play about the true life story of John Babbacombe Lee.

Its original title was In the Shadow of the Scaffold, or The Man They Could Not Hang but is better known under the later title.

The film was the first of three (to date) on this story, and is considered a lost film.

It is one of the most profitable early Australian films ever made. According to one writer, "The man who produced it never made any money, but the person to whom he sold it did. He would not call it a good picture; the title drew the public. It was a self-advertised film by reason of the history attached to it."

In 1920 The Bulletin called it "rather crude, but highly popular."

== Plot ==
John Lee returns home to Babbacombe after a number of years service in the navy. He becomes engaged to his childhood sweetheart Kate Merton but his rival, Fred Masterville, tries to frame him by depositing twenty pounds in his bed. However he is stopped when Lee's friend Dicky Dood sees this and takes the money for his own use.

Masterville breaks into Miss Cleveden's house with an accomplice, Jim Wells, intending to commit robbery. He is spotted by Miss Cleveden and kills her, putting the bloodstained knife in Lee's room. Wells accidentally sets fire to the room. Lee is arrested, tried, found guilty and sentenced to death. Three times he is taken to the scaffold but three times it fails.

Lee is given a life sentence. Masterville presses his claim but Kate remains true. Twenty two years later Masterville and Wells are caught attempting to rob Kate's house. Wells turns in Masterville, Lee is released and marries his old sweetheart.

== Cast ==
- Mervyn Barrington as John Lee
- Edna Phillips as his sweetheart
- Bobby Scott
- Bob Henry
- Fred Cope
- Mrs Charles Villiers

== Original Release: In the Shadow of the Scaffold ==
Newcastle Herald 11 November 1912

The film was reportedly based on a popular four-act play, The Man They Could Not Hang, which was adapted from Lee's true life story. (Another account says Lytton based the script on a book. A book of the story was extensively serialised in Australian newspapers in 1910.)

Frank Davenport, an Australian actor based in New Zealand said he read a copy of the book in New Zealand and decided to adapt it into a play. He fictionalised details - Davenport claimed it was he who added the love interest, a fight and the ending where the government compensated Lee. Davenport toured the play through New Zealand and Australia.

The play was performed through Australia in 1911 by the Curran, Devonport, and Armitago Dramatic Company. They appeared to produce it until around March 1912. According to one actor who appeared in the touring production of the stage play, "the weird horror drew the backblocks better than Hamlet."

Davenport says he told rights in the play in Sydney to Philip Lytton for "a very satisfactory figure" but said "the mistake I made was to let the film rights slip through my fingers." Lytton's company performed it from 1912 onwards. At one stage Lytton wanted to bring Lee to Australia on a lecture tour but Lee was too ill. Davenport says Lytton sold the rights to the play himself for thousands of pounds.

=== Film version ===
Lytton occasionally made films and produced a movie version of the play. It is likey the cast would have been drawn from the stage production. The director was Robert Scott, who played Dicky Dood in the stage version, and who had acted in some films for W.J. Lincol.

Scott later gave evidence at the 1927 Royal Commission into Film. Scott claimed it was made for under £300 and the title drew the public. It was a self-advertised film by reason of the history attached to it." He added "I directed what might be called a money spinner. It was crude but it earned money for the man who backed it... the people liked it as entertainment but it I would not call it a great production." When asked if the film was a comedy or tragedy he said "it was everything."

Scott called the film "a freak. You could not produce anything of the kind at that figure. The wonderful drawing power of the title must be borne in mind."

The film appears to have been first screened at the Alhambra Theatre in Sydney in late October 1912 under the title In the Shadow of the Scaffold, or The Man They Could Not Hang and it was 3,000 feet long.

Mr Barrington, who played the title role, lectured. This movie toured through Australia in 1913.

During this time Lytton continued to tour the play as well. (Peter Savieri's company toured with a version of the story in 1914.)

== Sterry and Haldane release ==
Dungog Chronicle 21 Nov 1916

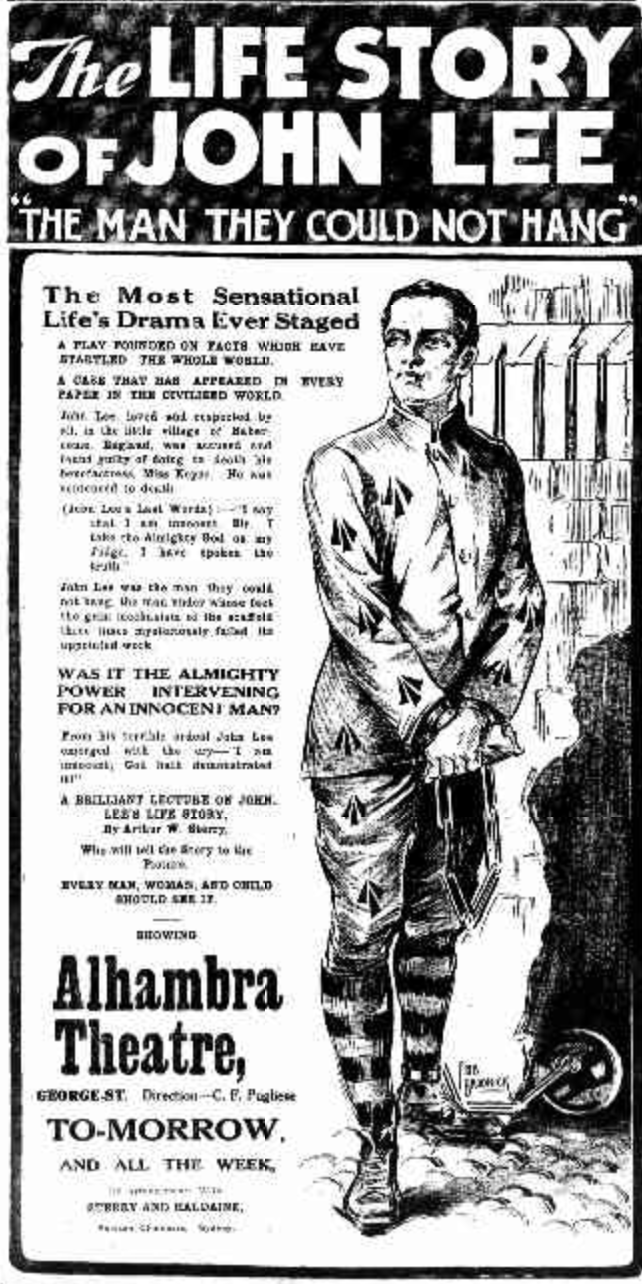
Sydney Sun 9 Sept 1917

According to Alex Hellmrich, once the film was completed, Lytton turned down an offer of £900 for the film. Then "some months later he made it a present to Messrs. [Frederick] Haldane and [Arthur] Sterry, who had been in his employ for some considerable time for their past good services."

Lytton was apparently unenthusiastic about the film's commercial prospects. Sterry and Haldane, distributed the film themselves throughout Australia, New Zealand and England, often giving a lecture to accompany screenings.

In April 1919 a contributor to The Bulletin wrote, "The much-cursed picture, The Man They Could Not Hang, was made in Sydney years and years ago... It was a scream. Lately some showman bought the old negative, set to work and re-took a lot on the story, joining it on to the old film. The original heavy lady being dead, a “double” was procured. She was only a couple of stone lighter."

Hellmrich says the film was "first released at one of Mr. Herbert’s shows at Newcastle... and the business was so great that it went back to that city four times within the next three months. It was afterwards screened throughout Australia with satisfactory results."

The film debuted in Newcastle on 15 November 1916. Sterry toured with the show. Occasionally Lee's son would appear with the film.

In September 1917 the film screened in Sydney where audiences were turned away and its commercial reception was regarded as "something phenomenal."

The Bulletin wrote "Theatres were packed by the atrocity and over £100 a week was often cleared on a percentage basis."

Haldane toured with the film in Queensland in 1918. Sterry toured with it in Western Australia that year.

An advertisement in 1919 claimed the film had been seen by more than one million people in Australia.

In April 1921 it was reported Sterry was back from New Zealand where the film had been "phenomenally successful, playing capacity everywhere." A piece the following month said it had played in New Zealand for two years and been "a wonderful money spinner." The film then continued to play country areas.

In 1925 Hellmrich estimated the film would earn £50,000. This means it could arguably be one of the most profitable Australian movies of all time. (Another account puts the gross at £20,000.)

Sterry and Haldane remade the movie in 1921.

A 1922 article said the play (or film) was dramatised by Edmund Cording who sold it to Sterry adding "Cording made practically nothing out of the deal, but it is a shame to think just what Sterry got from this feature which owes a good deal to the title."

In 1926 Everyones reported the film was still playing in Britain for several years, although this may have been the 1921 version. A columnist said "I well remember Phillip Lytton being so disgusted with the picture that he gave it to his servitors, Sterry and Haldane, who, utilising publicity to some extent, made a fortune out of it."

There was another version of the film in 1934, directed by Raymond Longford and starring Sterry, but this was not very successful commercially.

== Critical reception ==
According to one review it was "a lecture picture" where Sterry prepared "the audience at the outset for the story" and "speaks in an enlightening manner throughout the screening of the film and the most telling of all he simulates in voice the characters in the picture who from time to time speak through him."

The Bulletin said "It was a scream".

The Newcastle Northern Times said "the producer has succeeded in keeping every character accurately drawn."
