= John Babbacombe Lee =

British murderer who escaped execution three times

John "Babbacombe" Lee
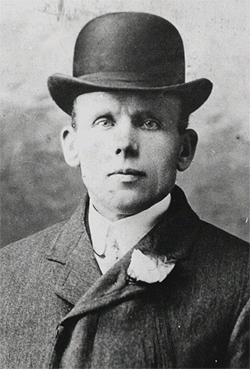
- Born: John Henry George Lee; 15 August 1864; Abbotskerswell, Devon, England
- Died: 19 March 1945 (aged 80); Milwaukee, Wisconsin, US (possible)
- Known for: Execution survivor

John Henry George "Babbacombe" Lee (15 August 1864 – 19 March 1945) was an Englishman famous for surviving three attempts to hang him for murder. His sentence was commuted to life imprisonment. Lee became popularly known as "the man they couldn't hang".

== Background ==
Born in Abbotskerswell, Devon, Lee served in the Royal Navy, and was a known thief.

In 1885, following an inquest in St Marychurch Town Hall and subsequent trial at Exeter Guildhall, Lee was convicted of the murder of his employer, Emma Keyse, at her home at Babbacombe Bay near Torquay on 15 November 1884, with a knife. The evidence was circumstantial: Lee was the only male in the house at the time of the murder and had a prior criminal record for theft for stealing silverware from a previous employer.

== Attempted execution and aftermath ==
On 23 February 1885, three attempts were made to carry out Lee's execution at Exeter Prison. All ended in failure, as the trapdoor of the scaffold failed to open despite being carefully tested by the executioner, James Berry, beforehand. The medical officer refused to take any further part in the proceedings, and they were stopped. Berry provides a detailed account of the failed execution in his memoirs, My Experiences as an Executioner, noting that the trapdoor was adjusted with a saw and axe between the attempted executions, although in Berry's memoirs and letter to the Under-Sheriff he mentions only two attempted executions.

As a result, Home Secretary Sir William Harcourt commuted the sentence to life imprisonment. The Home Office ordered an investigation into the failure of the apparatus, and it was discovered that when the gallows was moved from the old infirmary into the coach house, the draw bar was slightly misaligned. As a result, the hinges of the trapdoor bound and did not drop cleanly through. Lee continued to petition successive Home Secretaries and was finally released in 1907.

The only other man in history known to have survived three hanging attempts was Joseph Samuel, in September 1803, in Sydney, Australia.

An alternative theory, raised by Ernest Bowen-Rowlands in his book In the Light of the Law, suggests that the trap was blocked by a wooden wedge that was inserted by a prisoner working on the scaffold, and removed when the apparatus was tested. Note that Bowen-Rowlands only cites an anonymous "well-known person", citing an equally anonymous prisoner's confession, and this would contrast with Berry's reputation (noted by prison governors and surgeons) as a meticulous professional.

== Later years and identifications ==
After his release, Lee seems to have exploited his notoriety, supporting himself through lecturing on his life, even becoming the subject of a silent film. Accounts of his whereabouts after 1916 are somewhat confused, and one researcher even speculated that in later years there was more than one man claiming to be Lee. It was suspected that he died in the Tavistock workhouse sometime during the Second World War. However, more recent research concludes that he may have died in the United States under the name of "James Lee" in 1945. According to this research, presented in the book The Man They Could Not Hang (Holgate and Waugh, 2005), Lee's gravestone was located at Forest Home Cemetery, Milwaukee in 2009.

== Popular culture ==
- The Life Story of John Lee, or The Man They Could Not Hang, a lost 1912 film
- "Babbacombe" Lee, a 1971 album by Fairport Convention
- The case was covered and examined in a 2021 episode of the BBC One series Murder, Mystery and My Family, in which the verdict originally reached by the jury was upheld.
- The Men They Couldn't Hang, British folk punk group whose name was inspired by Lee

== See also ==
- Joseph Samuel, also referred to as "The Man They Couldn't Hang"
- Willie Francis
- List of botched executions
- The Imaginarium of Doctor Parnassus, 2009 Terry Gilliam film in which a character is revived after hanging
