= C. H. Book =

Australian lawyer (1895–1954)

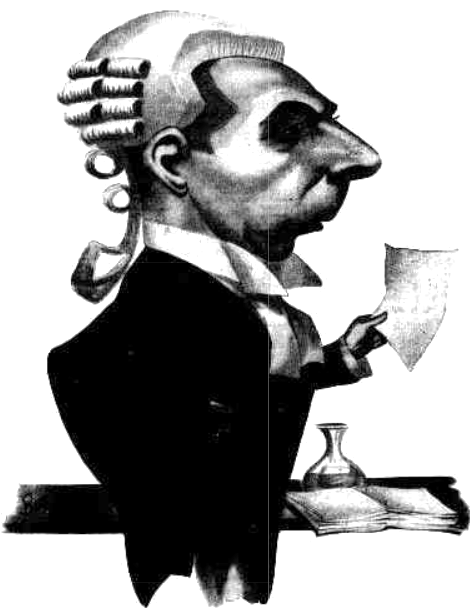
1928 caricture by Reynolds

Clifford Henry Book (12 May 1895 – 8 June 1954) was a lawyer and crown prosecutor in Melbourne, Victoria.

== History ==
Book was born in Liverpool, England, youngest son of Anthony R. Book and his wife Annie P. Book.

He graduated LLB from the University of Melbourne in 1915, served with the 23rd Battalion during WWI, was admitted to the Bar in March 1920. He was appointed assistant crown prosecutor in November 1925 and succeeded C. G. Macindoe as crown prosecutor in 1926.

A noted Freemason, he died in the Masonic Hospital, East Melbourne, aged 59.

== Recognition ==
Book was the subject of a March 1928 Table Talk character study by C. R. Bradish, and a caricature by L. F. Reynolds.

== Family ==
Book married Zillah Roberts of "Broadoak", Knutsford Street, Balwyn, Victoria, on 29 September 1927.
