= Will Dyson =

Australian artist (1880–1938)

William Henry Dyson
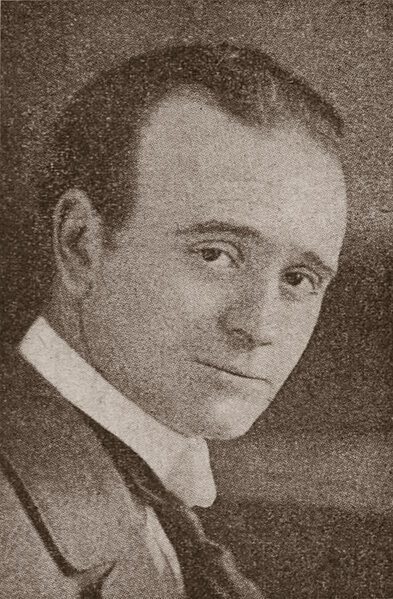
- Will Dyson, photographed in 1916.
- Born: William Henry Dyson; 3 September 1880; Alfredton, Colony of Victoria
- Died: 21 January 1938 (aged 57); Chelsea, London, England
- Occupations: Cartoonist, illustrator, caricaturist
- Spouse: Ruby Lindsay (m. 1885; died 1919)
- Children: Betty (b. 1911)
- Writing career
- Pen name: 'Asa Dane', 'Emu'

William Henry "Will" Dyson (3 September 1880 – 21 January 1938) was an Australian illustrator, artist and political cartoonist who achieved international recognition. He initially worked as a freelance artist in Australia, developing a specialty as a caricaturist, notably in The Bulletin magazine. In 1909 Dyson married Ruby Lindsay and the couple settled in London soon afterwards. As cartoonist for The Daily Herald newspaper, Dyson became widely known as an illustrator and commentator supporting progressive social reforms in Britain. His cartoons were often controversial, tackling difficult issues such as poverty, inequality and war, and were characterised by their biting wit and artistic impact. At the outbreak of World War I Dyson directed his scathing artwork at German militarism. In 1916 he applied to join the Australian forces at the Western Front as an artist. He was appointed an honorary lieutenant and joined the Anzac troops in France in January 1917. By the following May his appointment as Australia's first official war artist was formalised. After the death of his wife in March 1919 Dyson went through a difficult emotional period, during which his artistic output suffered. In late 1924 he returned to Australia after accepting a contract to work for the Herald publishing group in Melbourne. Dyson returned to England in 1930. He died in London in 1938, aged 57.

== Biography ==
=== Early life ===
William Henry Dyson was born on 3 September 1880 at Alfredton, a suburb of Ballarat in central Victoria, the ninth of eleven children of George Arthur Dyson and Jane (née Mayall). His father had emigrated to Victoria in 1852 and worked as a miner in the Ballarat district, but by the time of William's birth, he was working as a dry-goods hawker.

In about 1883 the Dyson family settled in South Melbourne. William's elder brother Edward, an aspiring writer, worked as a factory hand in his uncle's paper-bag factory and become the main financial support for the family.

Will Dyson attended the Albert Park State School until 1892. Dyson exhibited early talents for drawing and writing, for which he was supported and guided by his sisters and elder brothers, Ted and Ambrose. His father was locally active in the emerging labour movement, as were his older brothers. Ted and Ambrose Dyson contributed articles and drawings to a socialist newspaper, The Champion, published in the mid-1890s.

=== Freelance artist ===
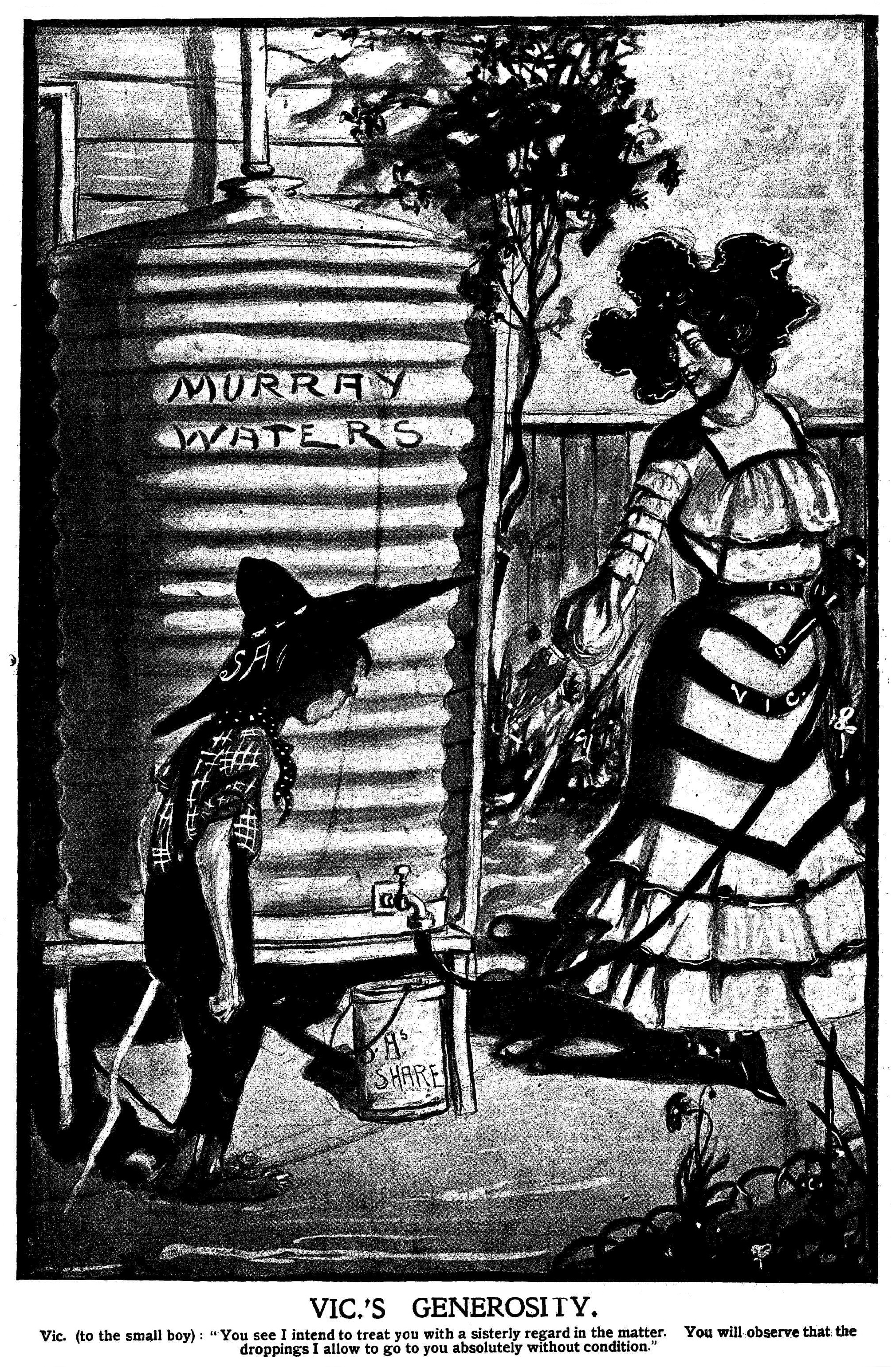
'Vic's Generosity', cartoon depicting South Australia's grievance against Victoria regarding the waters of the Murray River; Will Dyson, The Critic (Adelaide), 5 October 1904.

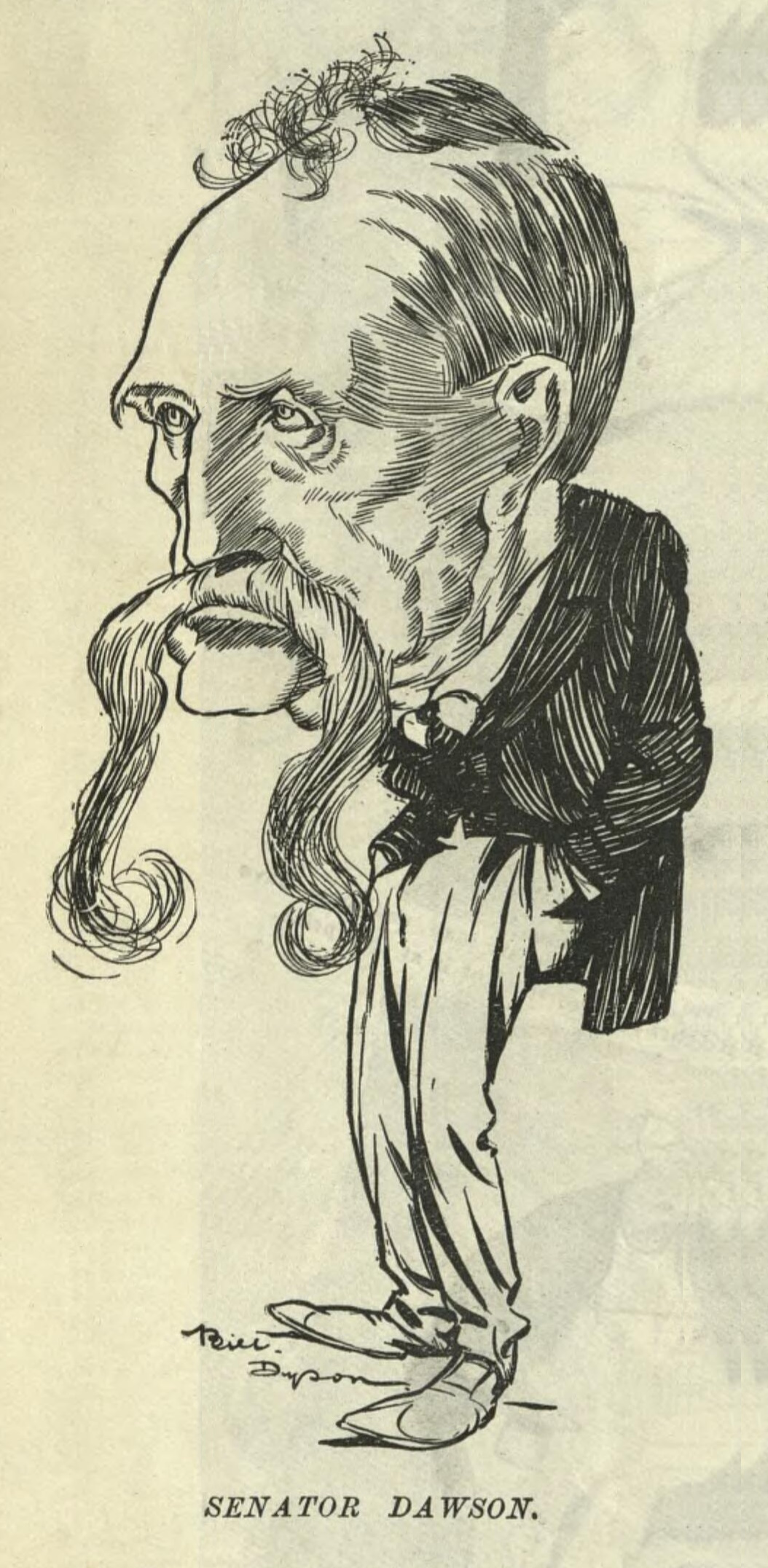
'Senator Dawson', caricature of Anderson Dawson, Australian senator for Queensland (1901–1906); published in The Bulletin, 7 June 1906.

Dyson began submitting illustrations to The Bulletin magazine in 1897, aged seventeen, at a stage when he was still striving to develop his drawing style. He had cartoons accepted for publication in the Adelaide weekly The Critic during 1897. In about 1898 Dyson met Norman Lindsay and the two aspiring artists formed a close friendship. Both young men had grown up in the goldfields region of Victoria. They would often go about the streets of Melbourne in search of subjects to draw, both young men at that time in the process of refining their respective illustrative techniques. Dyson was a keen amateur boxer, as were his older brothers Ambrose and Ted. His friend Norman Lindsay also shared Dyson's interest in boxing. Dyson joined the Cannibal Club, a coterie of young artists in Melbourne whose members included Lindsay and his brothers Lionel and Percy, Tom Durkin, Max Meldrum, Hugh McCrae and Alex Sass.^{[A]} The Dyson and Lindsay families, the members of which shared common artistic and literary talents and interests, began to develop close bonds. In 1903 Lionel Lindsay (Norman's older brother) married Jean Dyson (Will's older sister) at the Sydney suburb of Woollahra.

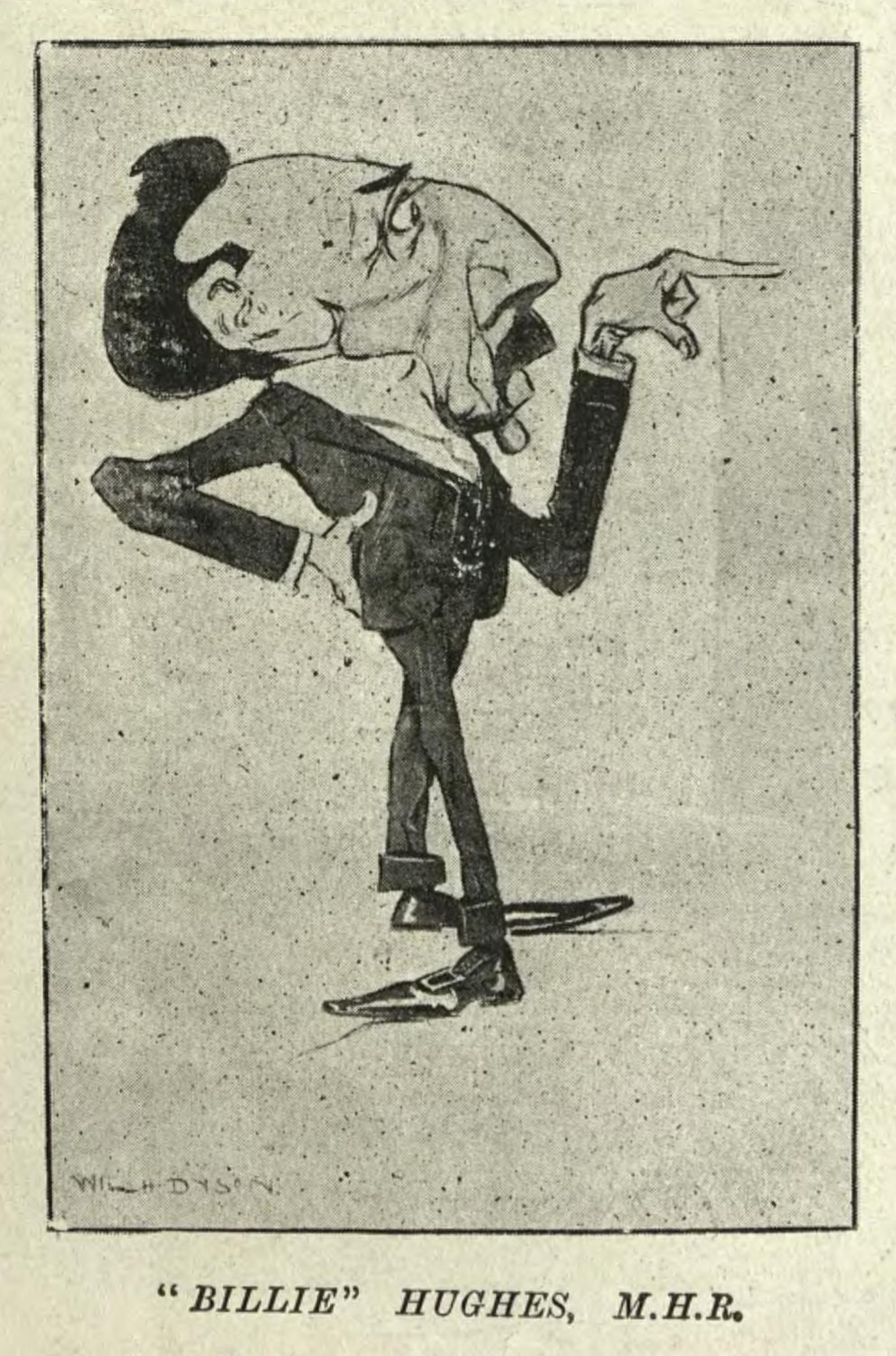
Caricature of Billy Hughes, published in The Bulletin, 28 December 1905.

Dyson's first illustration accepted by The Bulletin was purchased for three guineas. From early 1900 Dyson's illustrations and cartoons began to be published in the Sydney-based Bulletin magazine, his early contributions appearing under the pseudonym 'Asa Dane'. He became a regular contributor, with conservative politicians being a frequent target of his satire. Fellow artist Hal Gye, in describing Dyson's skill as a caricaturist, commented: "Relentlees and cruel, he disturbed many a fat politician's quiet calm, and many an actor's contentedness, and yet as bitter as he was with his pencil he was quite the opposite himself".

Ambrose Dyson had been employed as an artist by The Critic, the weekly journal based in Adelaide. In about June 1903 he left to take up the position of art representative in Melbourne for the Sydney-based Bulletin magazine. After his brother's departure, Will Dyson was employed as a staff artist and writer at The Critic, for which his contributions included coloured caricatures. Dyson had begun experimenting with colour-printing techniques using "tinted wood-cuts and litho-inked line-blocks".

Dyson remained in Adelaide for only a short period, after which he moved between Melbourne and Sydney depending on where he could find work. In Sydney he stayed with his sister Jean and brother-in-law Lionel Lindsay. Dyson provided illustrations for his brother Edward's book Fact'ry 'ands, published in 1906. He contributed to the Native Companion and The Lone Hand in 1907. In 1908 Dyson's coloured political illustrations were featured on the covers of Randolph Bedford's mining and literary journal, The Clarion (at that time Melbourne's answer to The Bulletin).

In May 1909 Dyson held an exhibition of his caricatures at Furlong's Studio in the Royal Arcade, Melbourne. The exhibition was opened by Sir George Reid, previously Prime Minister of Australia, who delivered "a witty and delightful speech". The opening was attended by "a number of leading politicians, actors and other public men ... whose grotesque portraits were hanging in the collection". The exhibition was highly successful, with every picture being sold.

On 30 September 1909 Will Dyson and Ruby Lindsay were married at Creswick, in central Victoria. Ruby was the sister of Norman and Lionel Lindsay and a talented black-and-white artist in her own right. In early October 1909, within days of their wedding, Will and Ruby Dyson, accompanied by Norman Lindsay, departed for Europe aboard the steamer R.M.S. Osterley to further their artistic careers.

=== London ===
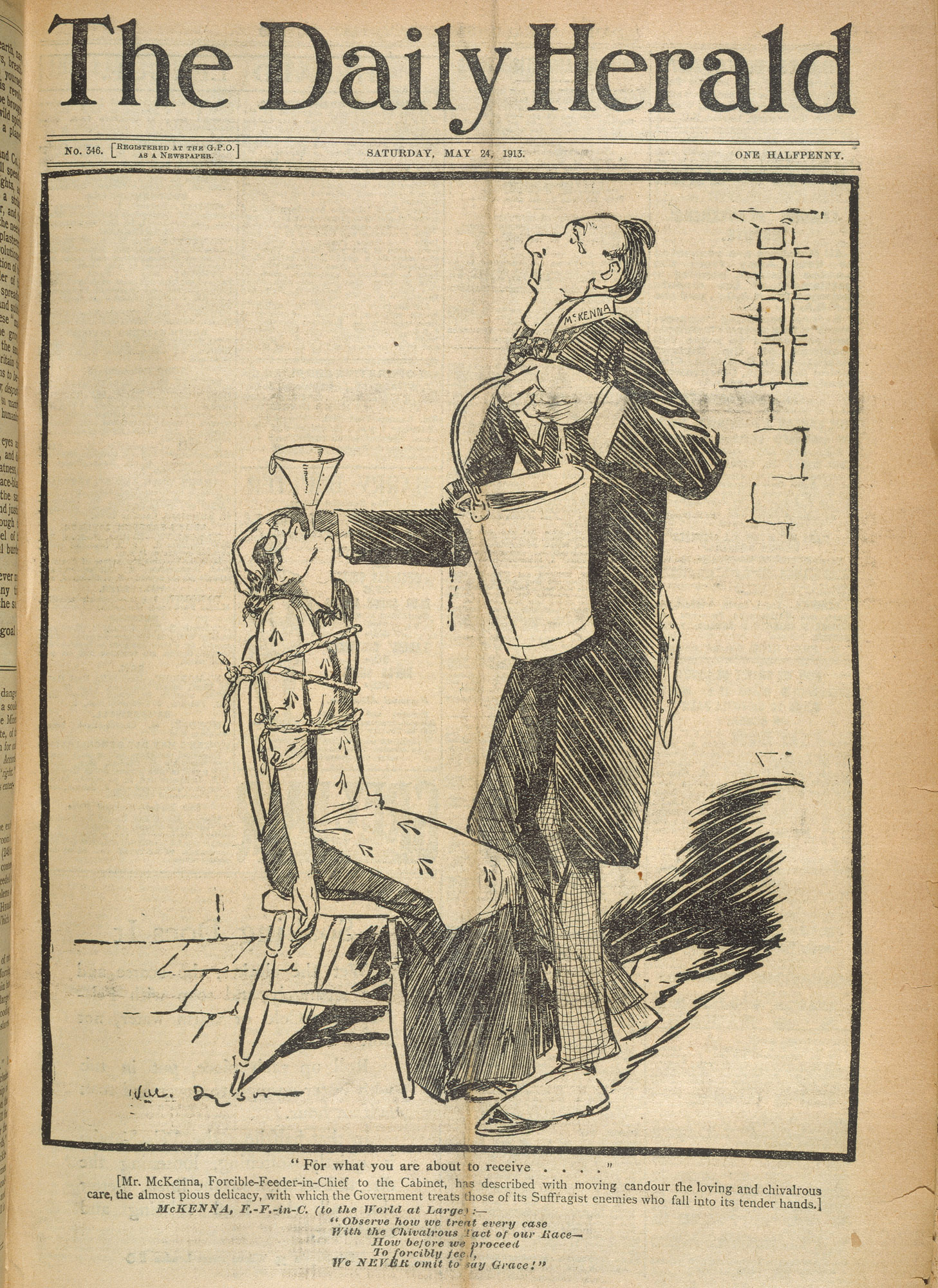
'For what you are about to receive...', the front page of The Daily Herald, 24 May 1913, featuring Dyson's depiction of the Home Secretary, Reginald McKenna, force-feeding a jailed suffragette.

In London Dyson's drawings were initially published in the socialist weekly magazine, The New Age. Soon afterwards he found work with Vanity Fair and the Weekly Dispatch newspaper. Will and Ruby Dyson settled in the fashionable London suburb of Chelsea. In 1911 Ruby gave birth to the couple's only child, a daughter named Betty. It was a period of considerable political upheaval in Britain, with Asquith's Liberal government challenging the powers of the House of Lords, organised agitation for female suffrage and industrial conflict leading to a large number of strikes. In December 1910 Dyson contributed illustrations to The World, a daily strike bulletin published by the printers' union, the London Society of Compositors. In January 1911 the strike sheet was renamed The Daily Herald. During 1911 a consortium of socialists and radical trade unionists began to raise funds to establish a permanent daily newspaper supportive of the labour movement, but independent of the Labour Party and the Trades Union Congress. It was decided to retain the name of the printers' union strike sheet and The Daily Herald newspaper was launched in April 1912, with Dyson appointed as its cartoonist-in-chief.

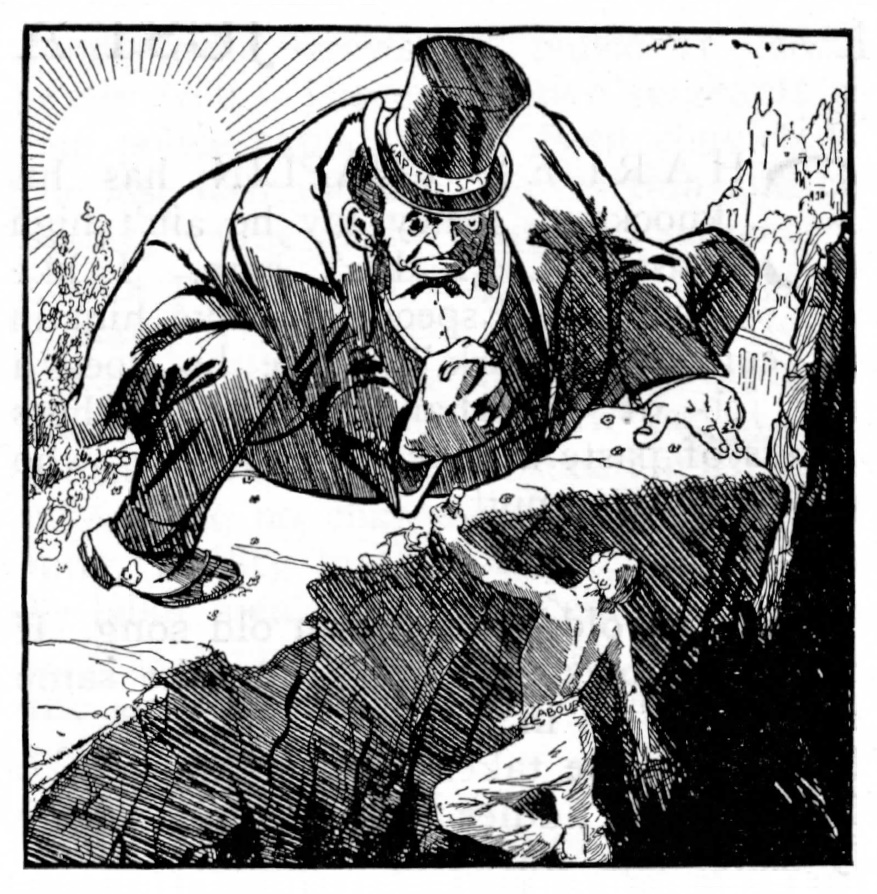
'Labour Wants a "Place in the Sun"', originally published in 1913 in the Daily Herald.

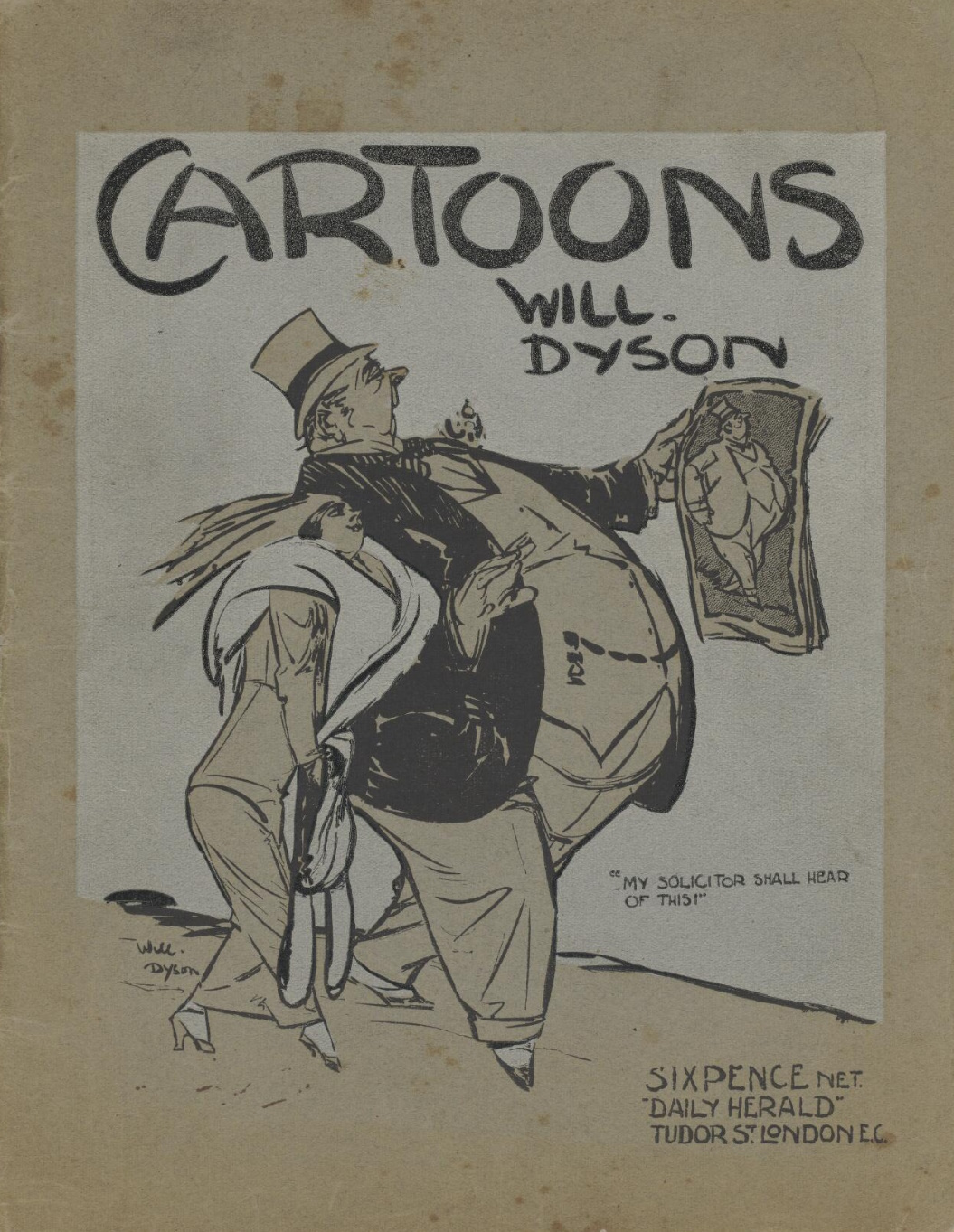
The cover of Cartoons, published in 1913; "My solicitor shall hear of this".

Dyson was paid five pounds a week and given carte blanche to engage in the expression of his ideas by the Daily Herald editor, Charles Lapworth. His large-format illustrations were regularly featured in the pages of the newspaper. He developed a dramatic visual language, often featuring symbolic representations of labour and capitalism. His capitalist 'fat man' represented the powerful financial elite, drawn as an overbearing portly figure with top hat and spats, the image of greed in an unjust world. Dyson's working man, the personification of labour, was depicted as young and militant, striving for social justice against the forces of exploitation and disadvantage.

In early January 1913 it was reported in Brisbane's The Worker that "capitalistic newspapers in London declare that King George has been grossly insulted by Will Dyson". His cartoon, published in the Daily Herald, depicted the king expressing astonishment at his subjects "drinking anything so common as rum", and saying: "I never came across any shortage of rum". Dyson's cartoons for the Daily Herald were occasionally reprinted in Australian newspapers associated with the labour movement such as The Australian Worker and The Socialist.

In June 1913 it was reported that Dyson, who "is now doing some of the best cartoon work in London, principally for the Daily Herald", had declined "an offer of £1,500 a year from a Chicago newspaper proprietary". The Daily Herald received financial support from the millionaire American soap manufacturer, Joseph Fels, who had close links with British socialists such as George Lansbury, who edited the newspaper from early in 1914. At one stage when the Herald "was near collapse", Fels agreed to contribute funds to keep it going on the condition that Dyson, who had received "tempting offers from America", should remain at the paper. To ensure this occurred a special fund was created so the artist could be paid at twenty pounds a week.

The fervour and anger of Dyson's Daily Herald cartoons had a remarkable impact in Britain and were admired by workers and intellectuals alike. Anthony Ludovici, writing in The New Age in June 1913, declared that in Dyson's depictions the "capitalist is not only drawn – he is quartered... [in] some of the most passionate, skilful and unmerciful cartoons it has ever been my good fortune to encounter". In 1913 The Daily Herald took advantage of Dyson's success by producing a collection of his cartoons.

=== War artist ===
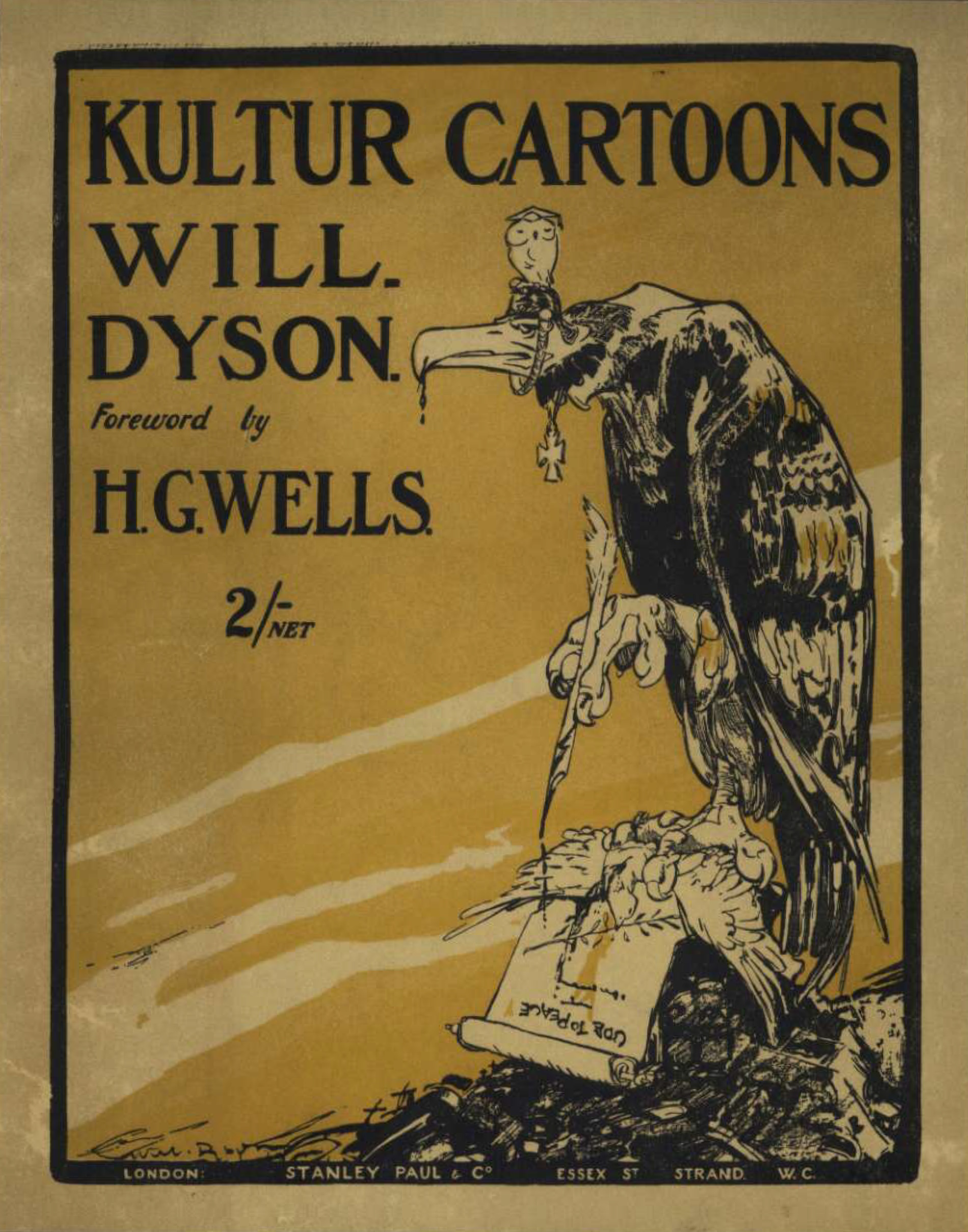
The cover of Kultur Cartoons (1915).

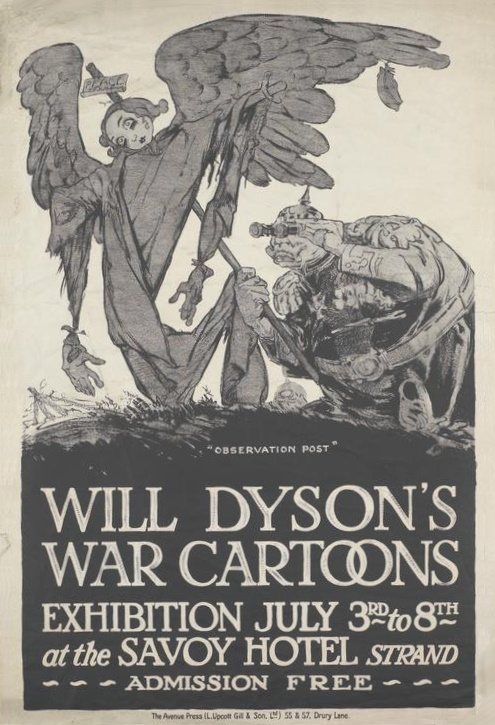
Poster for Dyson's 'War Cartoons' exhibition at the Savoy Hotel (July 1916).

At the outbreak of the World War I, Dyson directed his scathing cartoons at militarism, the evils of war and Kaiser Wilhelm, themes that accorded with the prevailing anti-German sentiment in Britain. In the early months of the war Dyson contributed war cartoons to The Nation and The Daily News. In January 1915 twenty of his drawings were published in a collection entitled Kultur Cartoons. The writer H. G. Wells wrote a foreword to the publication, observing that Dyson "perceives in militaristic monarchy and national pride a threat to the world, to civilisation, and all that he holds dear, and straightaway he sets about to slay it with his pencil". The original drawings from the publication were exhibited at the Leicester Galleries in London. The Daily Mail newspaper reproduced one of the 'Kultur' cartoons on the entire back page of its 1 January 1915 edition and praised Dyson as having "the most virile style of any British cartoonist". The Observer newspaper described Dyson "as one of the leading illustrators of the present day" and remarked that "his poignant humour strikes a deeper and more thrilling note than that of any other graphic humorist of to-day".

In August 1915 an exhibition of Dyson's war cartoons was held at The Centreway in Collins Street, Melbourne, opened by the Governor of Victoria, Sir Arthur Stanley. In his opening remarks, Stanley paid tribute to the artist, who had "established himself as one of the leading caricaturists of England, and one possessing a style and power of caricature distinctly his own".

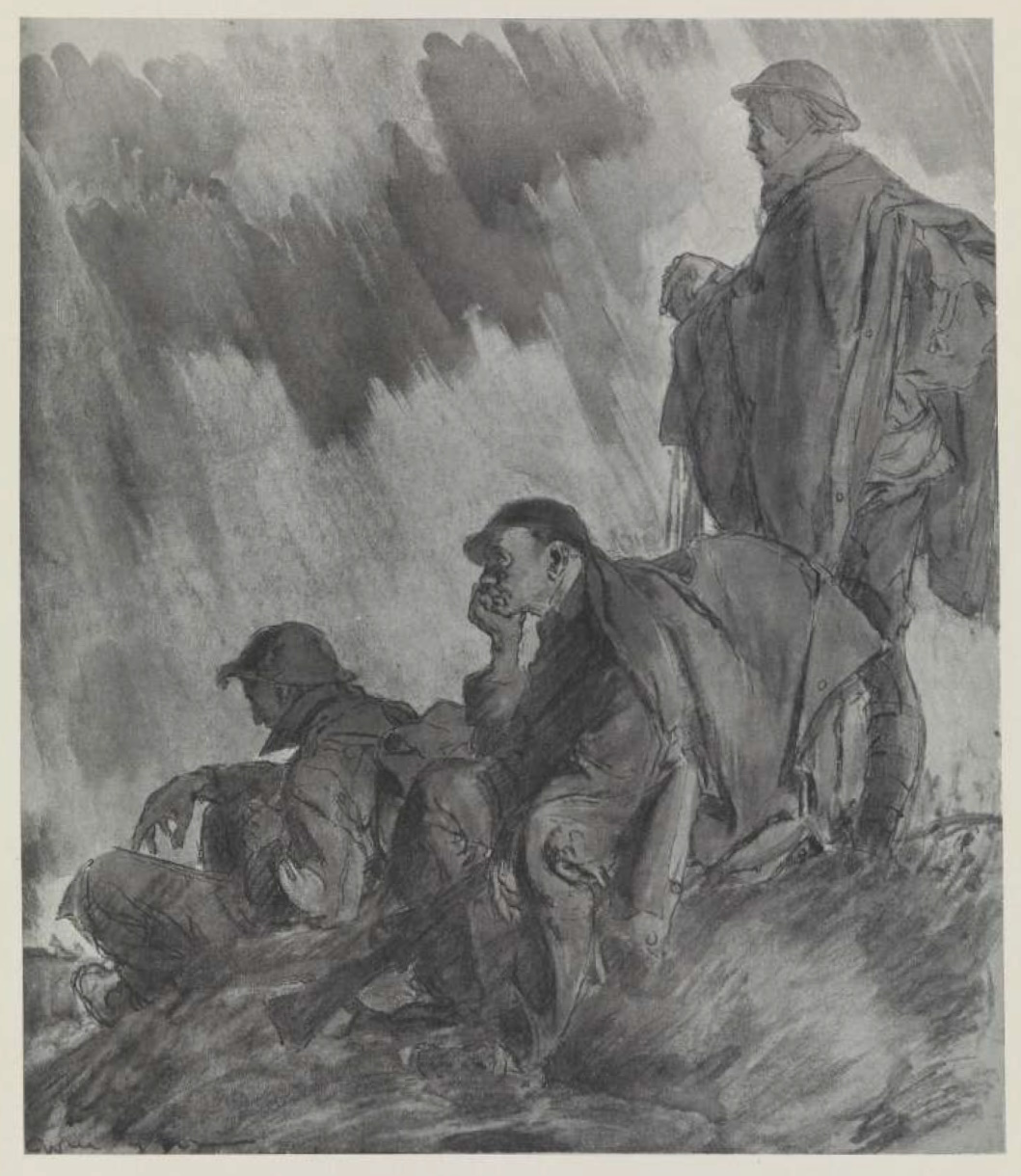
'Group' from Dyson's Australia at War (1918).

In early July 1916 an exhibition of Dyson's works entitled 'War Cartoons' was held at the Savoy Hotel in London. The collection included a number of lithographs (representing the artist's first attempt at this process). The cartoons were described as "characteristic examples of Mr. Dyson's use of the grotesque for the expression of his idea, which, in this case, is mainly the interpretation of the German mind".

During 1916 Dyson wrote to General Birdwood, the British commander of ANZAC troops on the Western Front, applying to join the Australian Imperial Force (A.I.F.) as an artist. His stated aim was to "interpret in a series of drawings, for national preservation, the sentiments and special Australian characteristics of our Army". Dyson's proposition received the approval of the Australian prime minister, Andrew Fisher, who requested that the artist be granted an honorary commission in the A.I.F. Dyson was appointed as a temporary and honorary lieutenant in December 1916. The appointment was to be without pay or allowance, with payment only for his carriage and keep. In January 1917 he crossed the English Channel to Calais and proceeded to the Anzac Headquarters at Étaples. Dyson's position as an artist attached to the A.I.F. was formalised in May 1917 when he was appointed as Australia's first official war artist, as part of the Official War Art Scheme.

Dyson mixed with the Australian soldiers, frequently in or near the front line trenches, and produced a large amount of sketches, drawings and paintings. He was inspired by the endurance and achievements of the Australian soldiers, but horrified by the suffering and loss of life he was witnessing. Dyson wrote of the subjects of his artwork: "I never cease to marvel, admire and love with an absolutely uncritical love our louse-ridden diggers, [they] are the stuff of heroes and are the most important thing on earth at this blessed moment". Charles Bean described Dyson as "the most intimate portrayer of the Australian soldier", who felt it was his duty to "give the world a faithful picture of them and of war". Dyson preferred to be amongst the men in the forward positions, and "shunned" army headquarters where he felt "out of place". Bean wrote: "No other official artist, British or Australian, in the Great War saw a tenth part as much of the real Western Front as did Will Dyson". Dyson was wounded twice during the war. In 1917 he was grazed in the face by shrapnel from a shellburst at Messines. Several months later he was wounded by another shellburst at Bellevaarde Ridge near Ypres.

Dyson became a member of an informal group that included the war correspondents, Charles Bean, Keith Murdoch, Henry Gullett and Frederic Cutlack, and the photographer Hubert Wilkins. Dyson's brother-in-law, Daryl Lindsay, had enlisted in February 1916. Lindsay, himself an artist, managed to get a transfer from the Medical Section of the A.I.F. to a position as Dyson's batman.

The Australian writer Vance Palmer wrote of Dyson that "the war made a tragic break" in his friend's life. When Palmer saw Dyson for the first time in three years, at the end of 1918, "his face had a haggard darkness; he was physically depleted; some of the buoyancy had gone out of his spirit".^{[B]}

=== Post-war ===
In March 1919 Dyson's wife, Ruby Lindsay, died in London from pneumonia aged 33, a victim of the Spanish flu pandemic. In June 1919 it was reported that Dyson was "in very bad health, and has been forbidden by his medical adviser to do any work for some time to come". He had been "in a state of nervous breakdown" since his wife's death. After Ruby's death Dyson went through a period of severe melancholy, during which the output of his work declined. During this period "he spoke often of ending things as a way out of his terrible depression". Dyson's grief over Ruby's death was expressed in Poems in Memory of a Wife, published in 1919. The following year a small volume of her artwork entitled The Drawings of Ruby Lind (Mrs. Will Dyson) was published by Cecil Palmer of London. In his introductory tribute in the book, Dyson wrote that Ruby's death "came after the Armistice, when it seemed that we might dare to hope again".

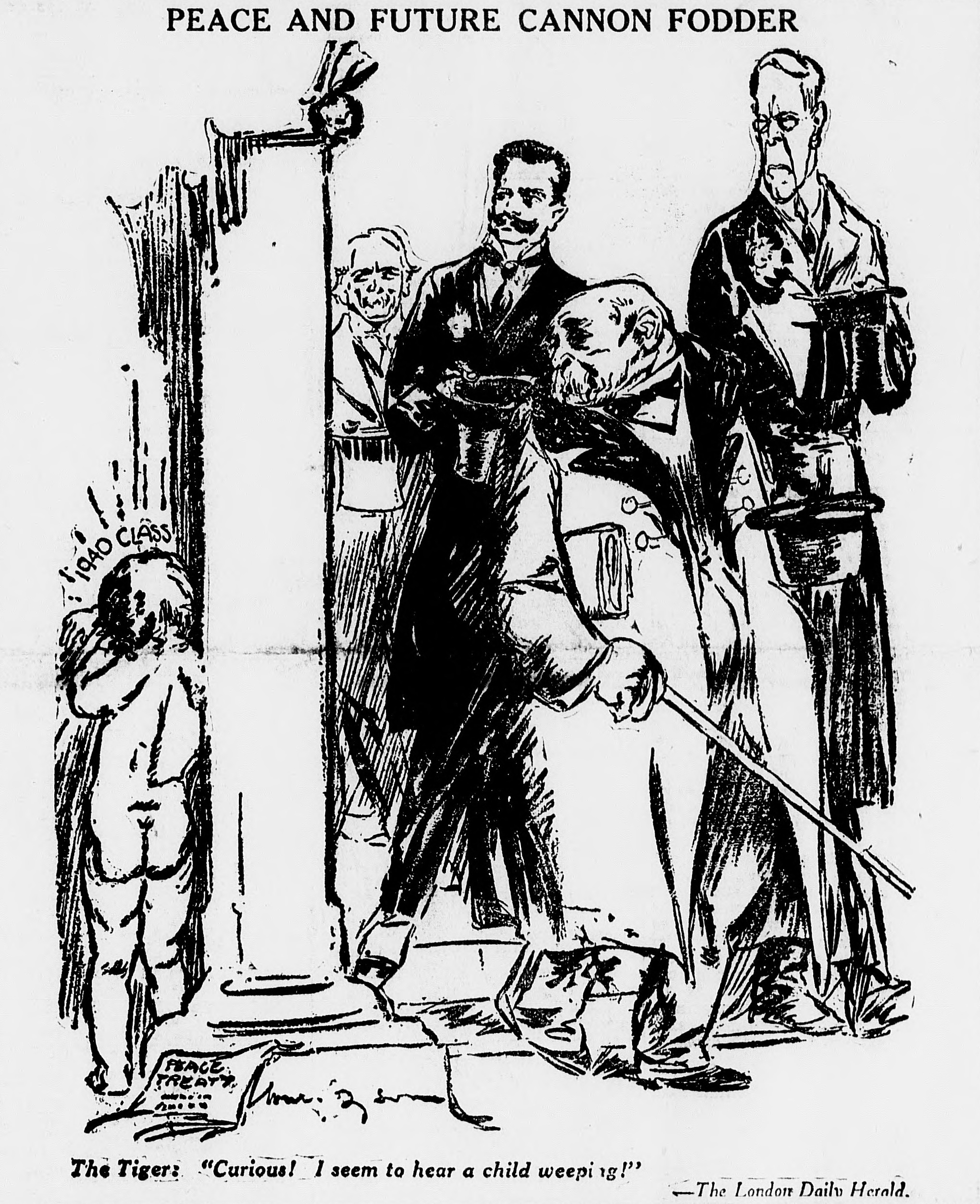
'Peace and Future Cannon Fodder', originally published in The Daily Herald, 17 May 1919.

One of Dyson's cartoons, published in The Daily Herald after his wife's death, is often singled out for its prophetic and vitriolic qualities. The drawing, published on 17 May 1919, was entitled 'Peace and Future Cannon Fodder'. It portrayed the Allied leaders (Vittorio Orlando, David Lloyd George, Woodrow Wilson and Georges Clemenceau) emerging from a meeting in Paris to discuss a post-war peace treaty (which later became known as the Treaty of Versailles). Clemenceau, identified by his nickname 'The Tiger', is depicted as saying to the others: "Curious! I seem to hear a child weeping!", while behind a pillar a naked child is sobbing, labelled "1940 Class".

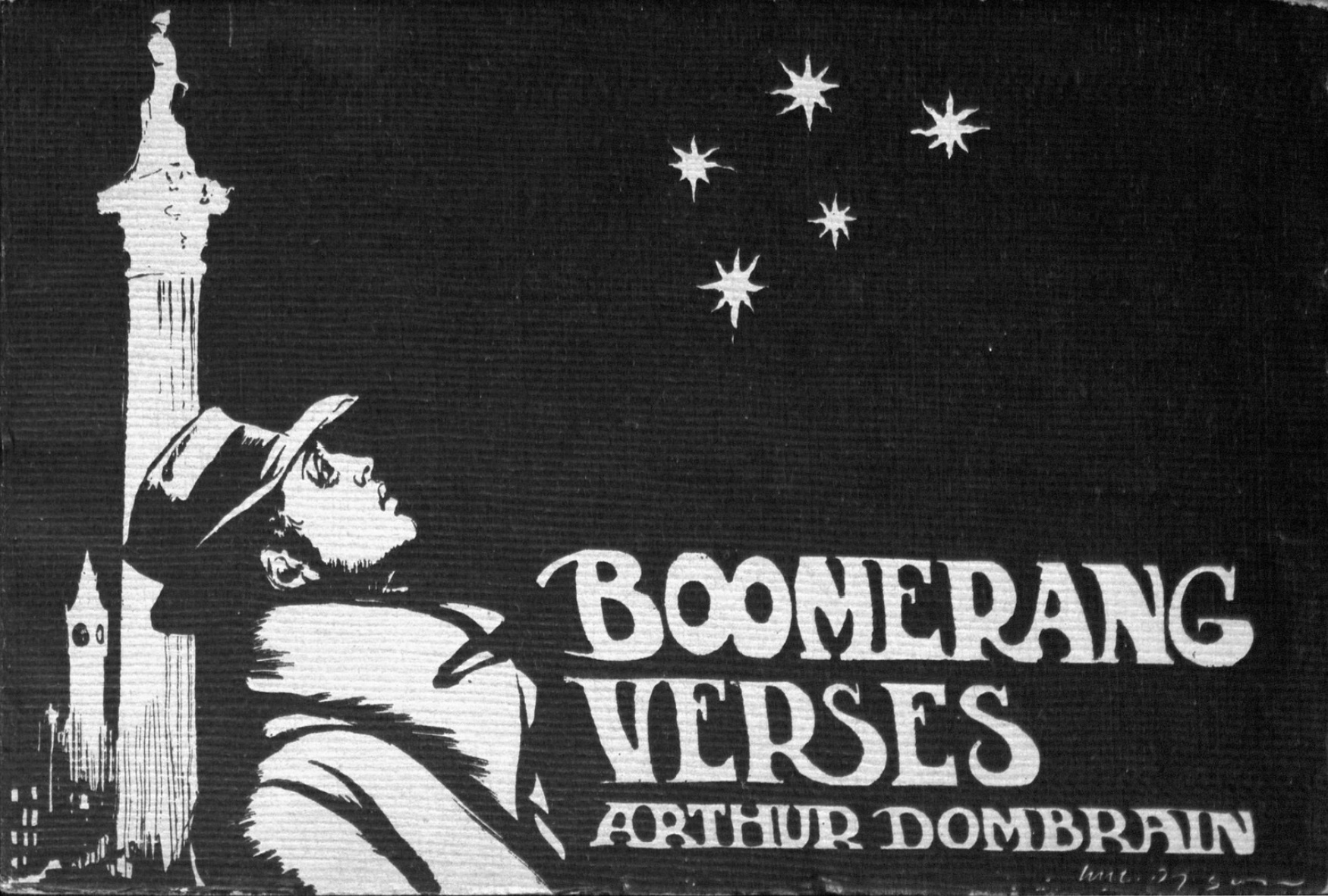
The cover of Arthur D'Ombrain's Boomerang Verses, cover design by Will Dyson.

By the early 1920s the Daily Herald was once again suffering from financial problems. In early 1922 the newspaper was taken over by the Trades Union Congress, a federation of British trade unions, and began operating as the official organ of the movement, with affiliations with the Labour Party. The resolutely independent Dyson resigned from the Daily Herald, unwilling to work under political constraints.

In January 1922 it was reported that Dyson was experimenting with stop-motion animation techniques, using figures modelled in plasticine. In about May 1922 Dyson began working for the John Bull magazine, together with his brother-in-law, the Australian journalist, Harrison Owen. The magazine's owners, Odhams Press, had recently terminated the contract of its editor, Horatio Bottomley, and Dyson joined on the understanding that John Bull was to be "recast from top to bottom" in order to "make the paper the organ of British Radicalism". Dyson's residence and studio was in Chelsea, which he shared with Owen and his wife (Dyson's younger sister, Esther).

In about September 1923 four drawings by Will Dyson were published in the London Mercury, "satirising the art world of London". Dyson designed the cover of Dr. Arthur D'Ombrain's Boomerang Verses, published in London in about June 1924. D'Ombrain was an Australian doctor working in London. After undertaking experiments in animation for the cinema, Dyson become disillusioned with the British film industry.

In late 1924 Dyson accepted an offer of a substantial salary to return to Australia and work for the Herald publishing group in Melbourne.

=== Return to Australia ===
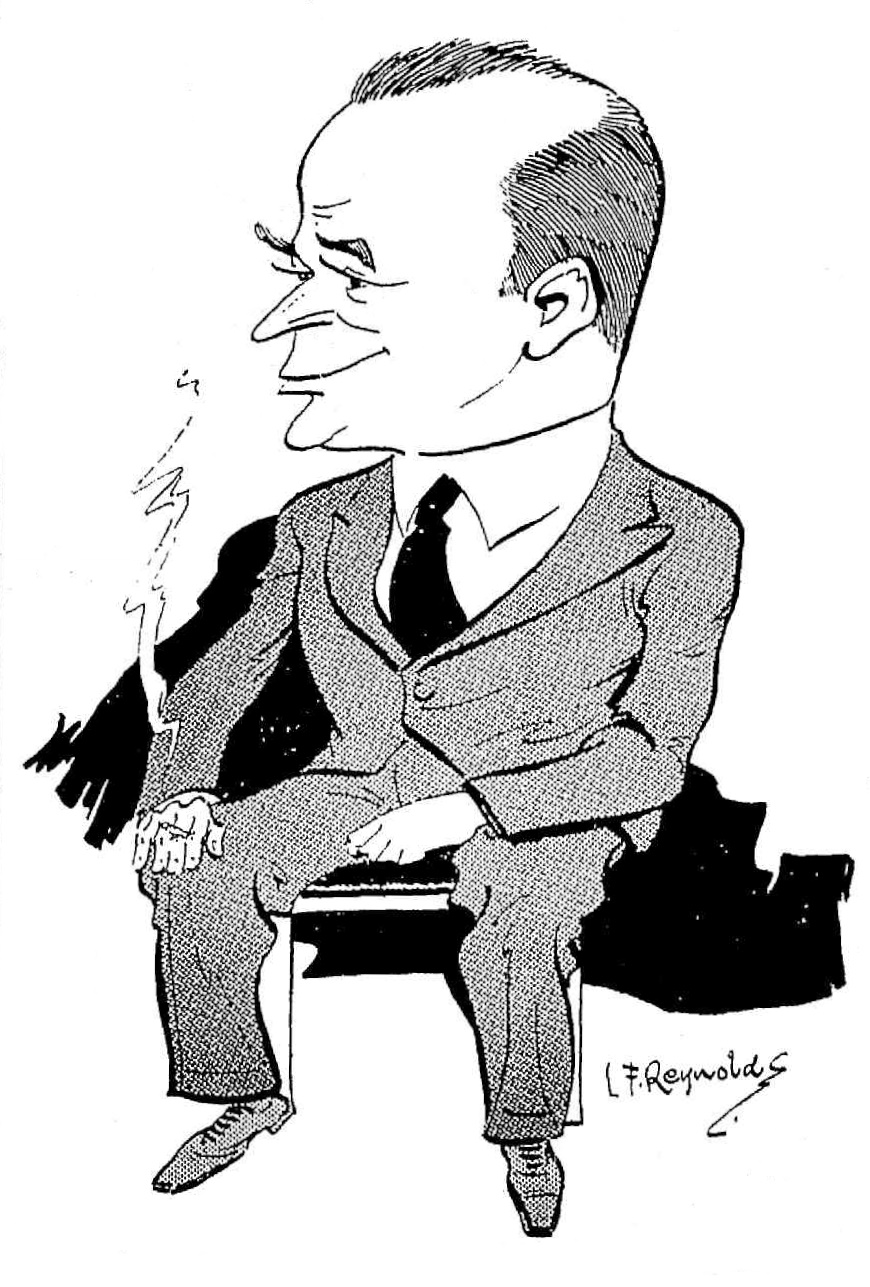
Caricature of Will Dyson by Len Reynolds, published in Table Talk, 23 December 1926.

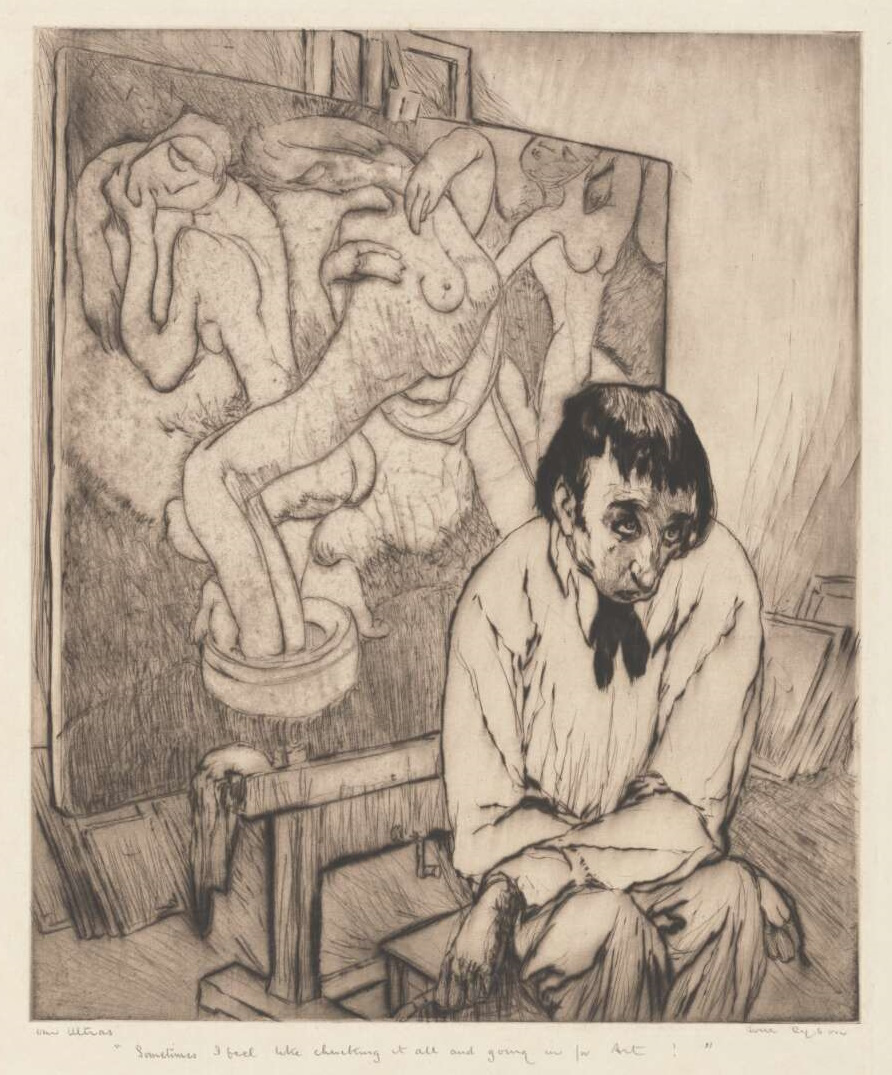
'Sometimes I feel like chucking it all in and going for art' (etching, c. 1929).

In March 1925 Dyson and his 13-year-old daughter Betty returned to Melbourne aboard the S.S. Oronsay. He had been induced back to Australia by Keith Murdoch, editor of The Herald newspaper, to join Percy Leason as a staff cartoonist for the Melbourne Punch. The editor of Punch, John Dalley, was willing to give Dyson full freedom to express himself, but the proprietors of the journal exerted pressure to limit his social and political satire. Eventually "Dyson was edged from his special field into the production of pleasant comic drawings, and he finally accepted this role of entertainer with a wry resignation". In December 1925 Punch was incorporated into the weekly magazine, Table Talk (which had been acquired by the Herald group in 1924).

In December 1926 an exhibition of four artists employed by The Herald and its allied publications was held at the Athenaeum in Melbourne. The featured artists were Will Dyson, Percy Leason, L. F. Reynolds and Claire Scott. During his five years in Melbourne, Dyson had an active social life, but professionally his return was less successful, finding the local situation "too restrictive and parochial". Dyson's drawings for Table Talk ranged from caricatures of theatrical personalities to commentary on local matters, though occasionally he was able to apply his "admonishing satire" upon broader issues such as unemployment and government neglect of education and science.

In the late 1920s Dyson became interested in drypoint etching, a skill he acquired under the tuition of the Melbourne etcher, Cyril Dillon.

In August 1929 Dyson delivered a lecture at Melbourne's Kelvin Hall (in Exhibition Street), on 'The Arts in Australia: A Plea and an Indictment', at the invitation of the educational committee of the Victoria League. By 1929 Dyson had become discontented with his life in Australia, describing it as "a backwater, a paradise for dull boring mediocrities".

=== America ===
On 9 January 1930, with his contract with the Herald group completed, Dyson and his daughter left Australia for America aboard the Sonoma. After arriving in Los Angeles, Dyson exhibited his etchings and dry-points in several major American cities.

In April 1930 a successful exhibition of Dyson's etchings was held at the Ferargil Galleries in Manhattan, New York. The exhibition led to the artist receiving a number of commissions for new etchings. One particular art dealer commissioned the artist "to do six satires on 'the movies'". Once described as "a bitter cynic who etches with the acid of his own bile", Dyson's satirical works were favourably reviewed. The critic in Time magazine described his works exhibited in New York as "brilliantly bitten etchings".

=== Return to London ===
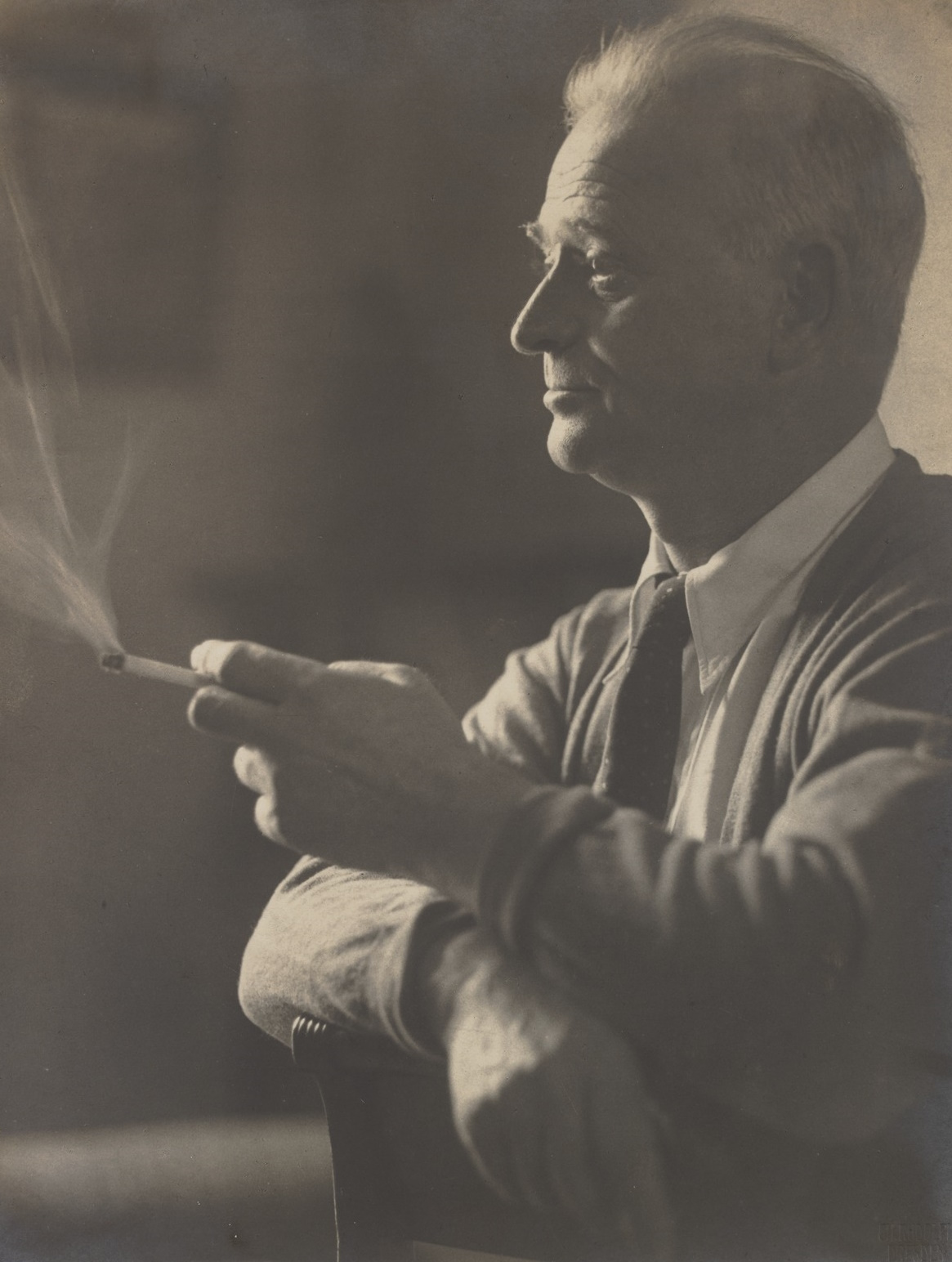
Photograph of Dyson, taken in 1933.

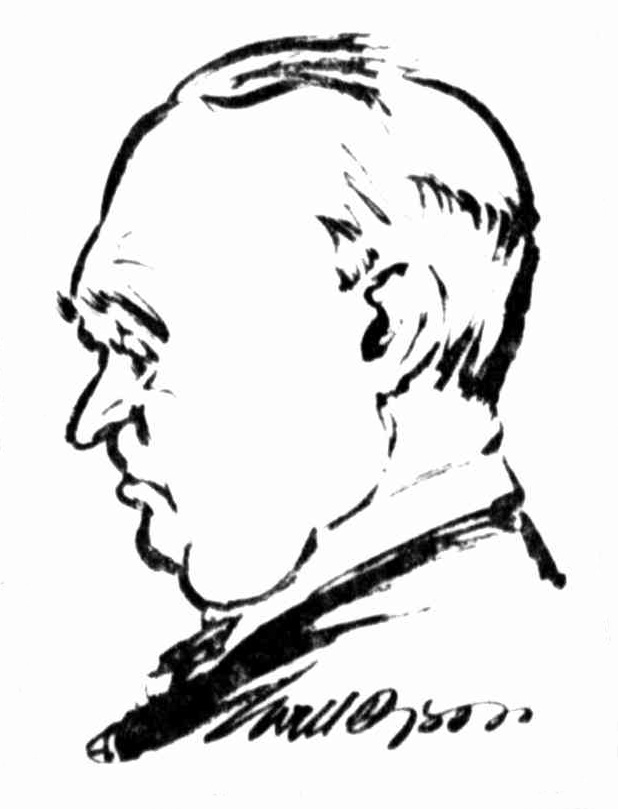
Self portrait by Will Dyson, published in The Herald (Melbourne), 22 January 1938

Dyson arrived in London in about September 1930. In an interview after his arrival, the artist admitted: "Yes, I suppose I have changed". He added: "I have attained the tolerance of middle-age, which is really born of the belief that nobody can do much to change anything". Dyson told the interviewer he was finished with "journalism and drawing for the papers, and am rejoicing in the freedom from the Oriental tyranny of editors". As an etcher he intended "turning my activities on the intelligentsia of the world – satirising their foibles and pretences". In early November 1930 it was reported that Dyson had completed "some fine satirical drawings, particularly of Hollywood people". He had refused offers for cartoon work and was "specialising in etchings both in Britain and America". Following him to London was his long term partner Clarice Zander.

In August 1931 it was reported that Dyson had been appointed as a cartoonist for the Daily Herald. He remained with the Daily Herald until his death in January 1938.

Dyson's interest in social problems led to his association with the Douglas Credit movement in England. In late 1933 he published a book called Artist Among the Bankers, a sharp critique of banking and the prevailing monetary system (and which included an explanation of Clifford Douglas' Social Credit theory).

Will Dyson died of heart failure on the afternoon of 21 January 1938 at his home in Chelsea, aged 57. He had attended a party the night before and worked in his studio in the morning before he died. In the afternoon he was found dead in his armchair, his spectacles on his forehead and a book beside him. Dyson was buried at London's Hendon Park Cemetery.

After Dyson's death in 1938, fellow-artist Norman Lindsay said of the late artist's approach to cartooning, he "would rather face any brutal reality than escape it in false sentiment".

== Collections ==
Dyson had a clear sense of the importance of his art and its preservation for posterity. In 1916, when he applied to go to the Western Front as an artist, he expressed a wish "to interpret in a series of drawings, for national preservation, the sentiments and special Australian characteristics of our Army". Over 270 of Dyson's sketches, drawings and paintings completed during his period as war artist were held by the Australian War Records after World War I. The artwork was incorporated into the collection held by the Australian War Memorial in Canberra when it opened in 1941.

The largest collection of Will Dyson's work is housed in national collections in Canberra, and he is also represented in state galleries in Melbourne and Sydney and at the Victoria and Albert Museum, London.

== Publications ==
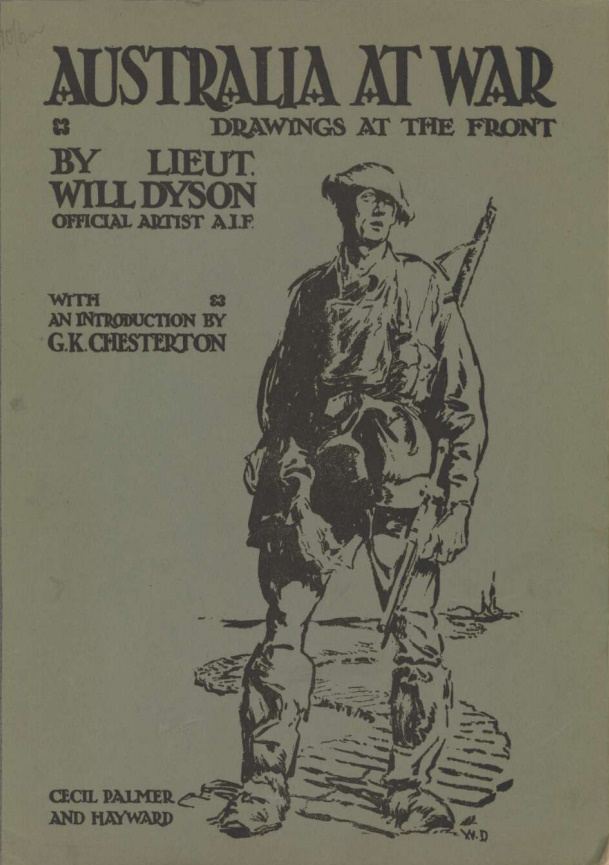
The cover of Australia at War (1918).

- Edward Dyson (1906), Fact'ry 'ands, Melbourne: G. Robertson; illustrations by Will Dyson.
- Will Dyson (1913, 1914), Cartoons, London: The Daily Herald.
- Will Dyson (1915), Kultur Cartoons, London: Stanley Paul & Co.; with a foreword by H. G. Wells.
- Souvenir programme (1916), Pioneer Exhibition Game: Australian Football (London: Wightman & Co.) – contributing artists: Ruby Lindsay, Will Dyson, Fred Leist, Laurie Tayler, Cecil Hartt and Dan Lindsay.
- Will Dyson (1918), Australia at War: Drawings at the Front, London: Cecil Palmer & Hayward; with an introduction by G. K. Chesterton.
- Will Dyson (1919), Poems in Memory of a Wife, London: Cecil Palmer.
- Edward Dyson (1919), Hello, Soldier!: Khaki Verse, Melbourne: Alex. M'Kinley & Co.; illustrations by Will Dyson, Ruby Lind and George Dancey.
- Arthur D'Ombrain (1924), Boomerang Verses, London: Anglo-Eastern Publishing Co.; cover by Will Dyson.
- Will Dyson (1933), Artist Among the Bankers, London: J. M. Dent & Son, Ltd.

== Gallery ==
A selection of images by Will Dyson
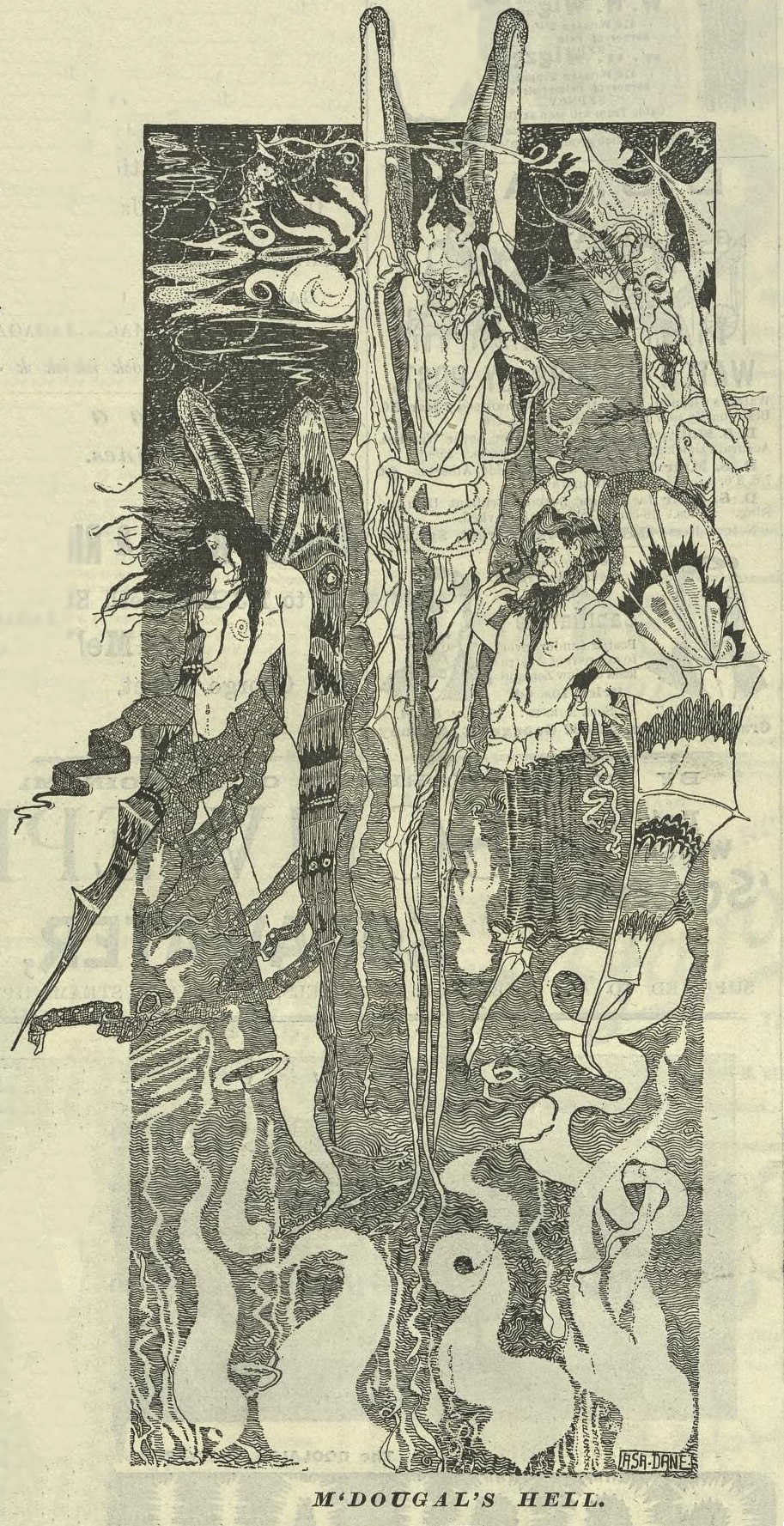
'McDougal's Hell' (signed 'Asa Dane'), published in The Bulletin, 3 February 1900.

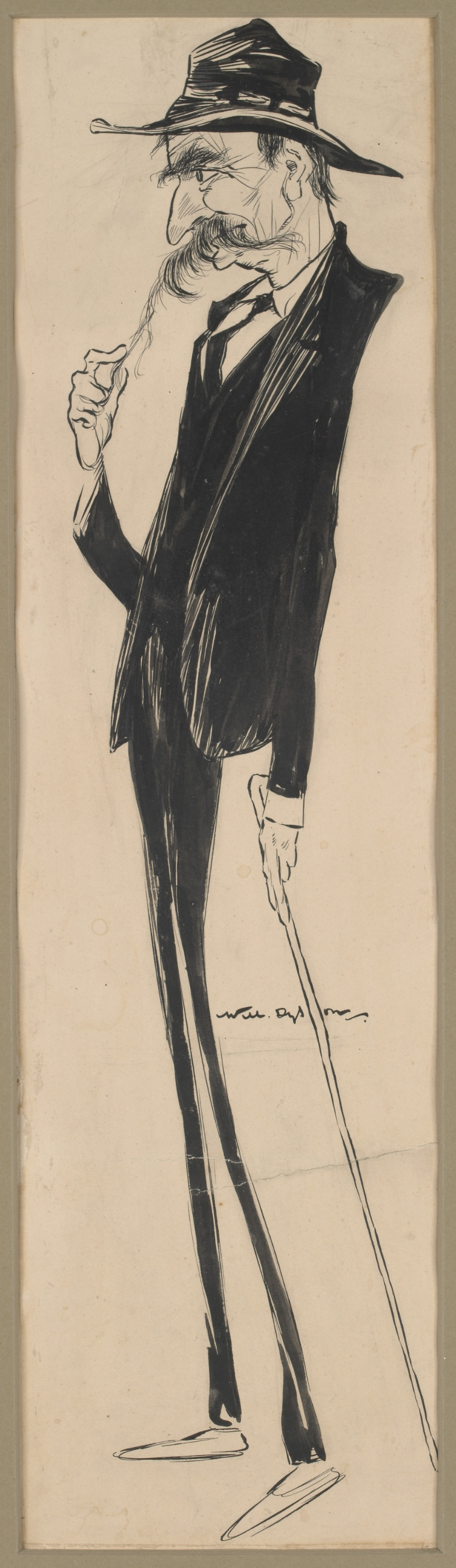
Caricature of Henry Lawson by Will Dyson (1908).

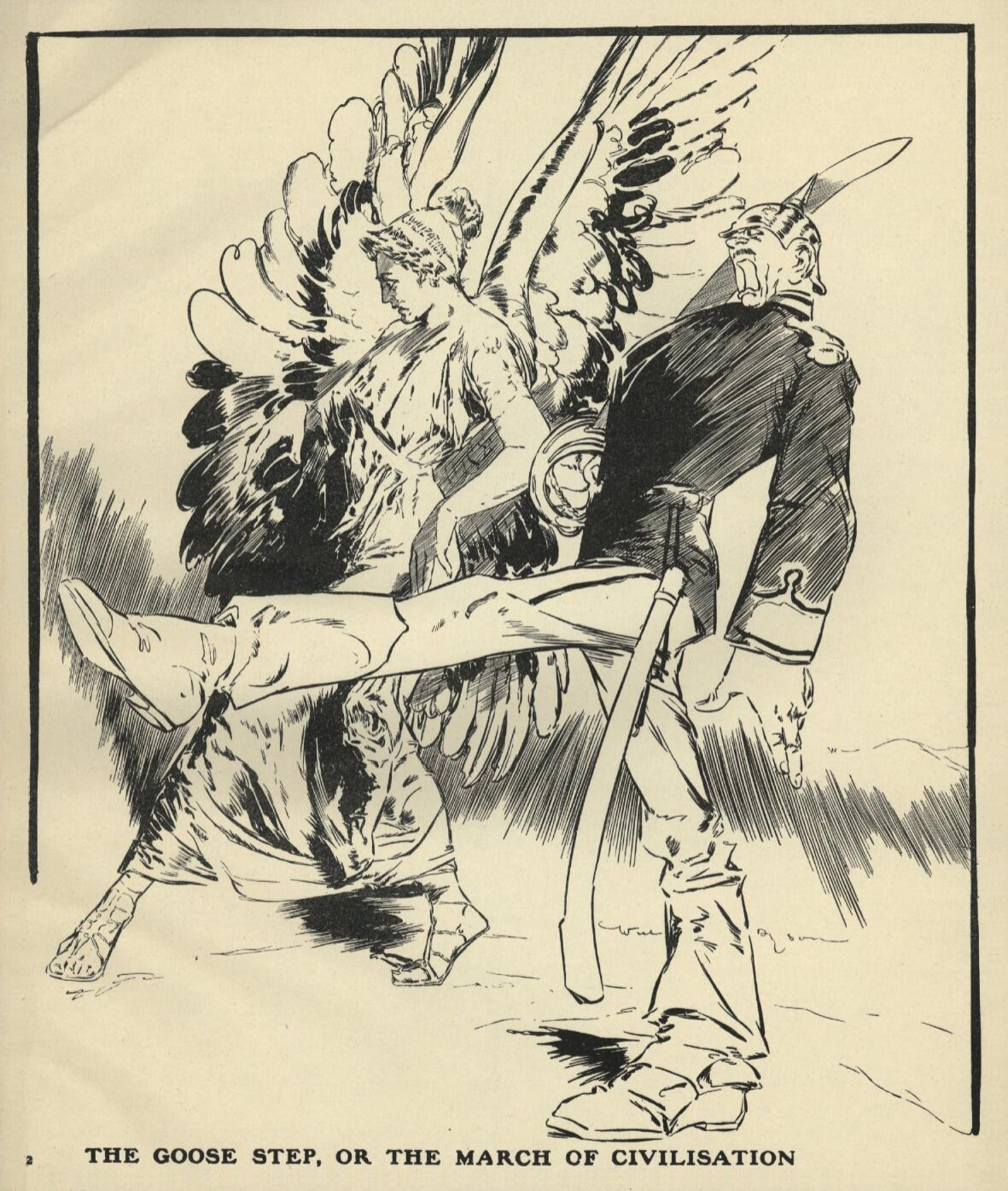
'The Goose Step, or the March of Civilisation', illustration from Kultur Cartoons (1915).

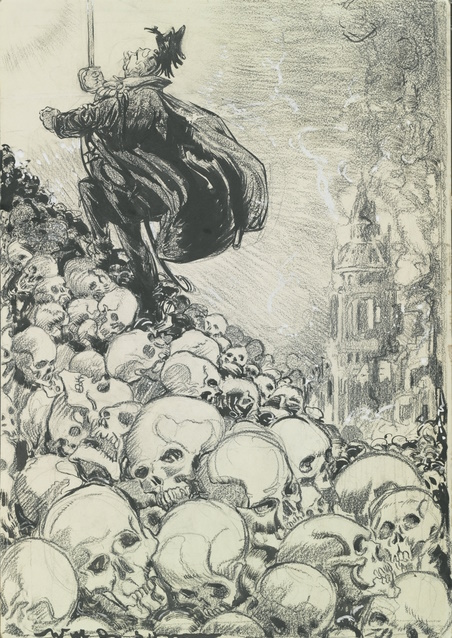
'Stepping stones to higher things', drawing by Will Dyson (c. 1915–16).

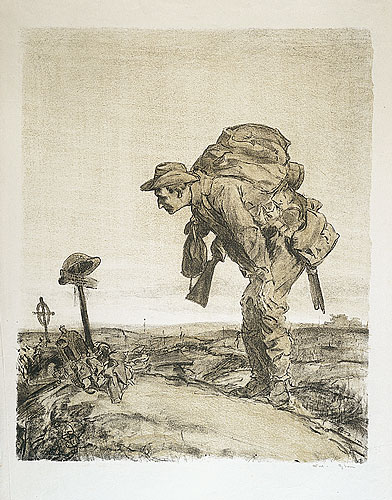
'One of the old platoon' (1917) (lithographic print).

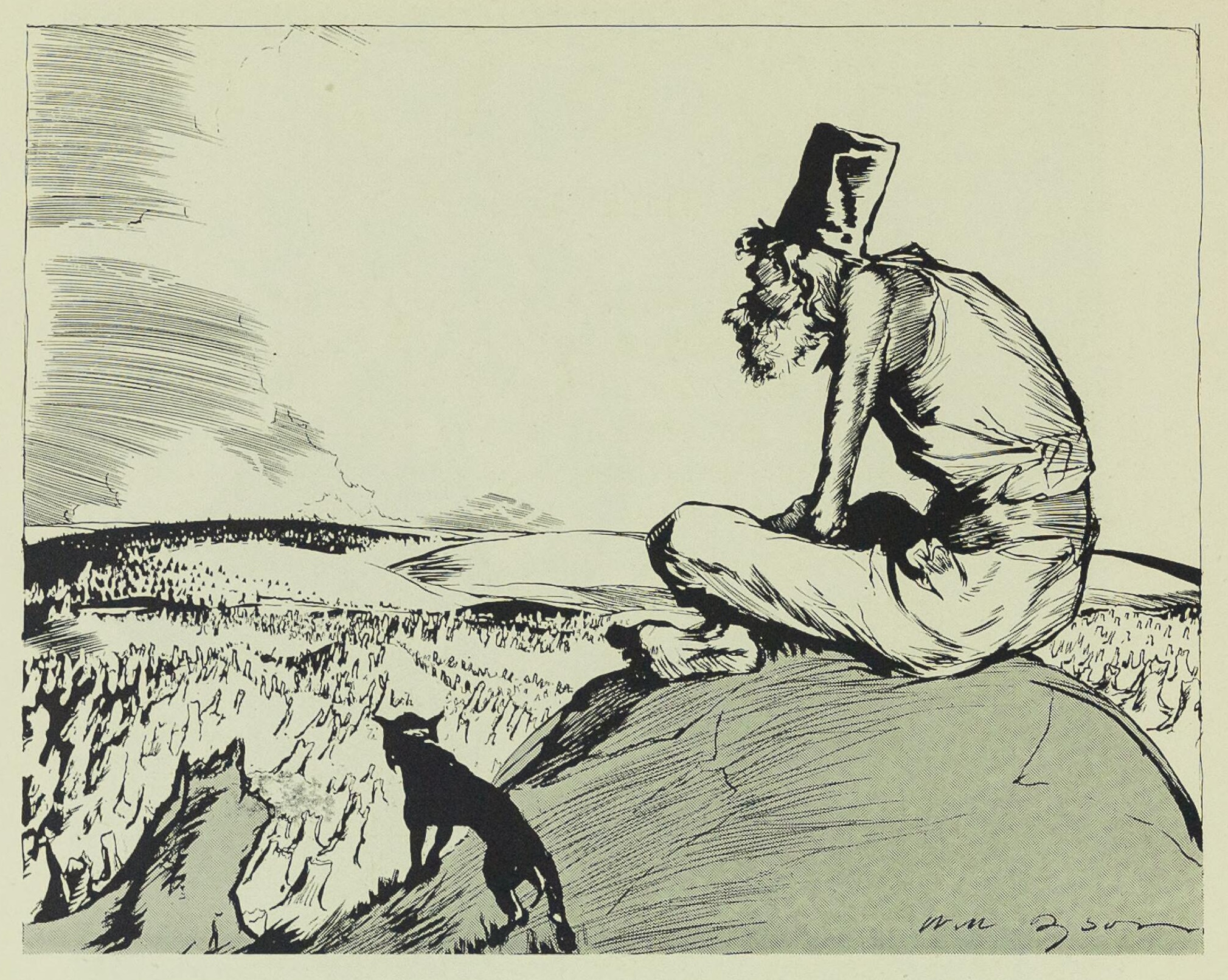
'Australian Forest Destruction', published in Art in Australia, 1 June 1926 (caption: "My word, pretty soon none of us real Australians left!").

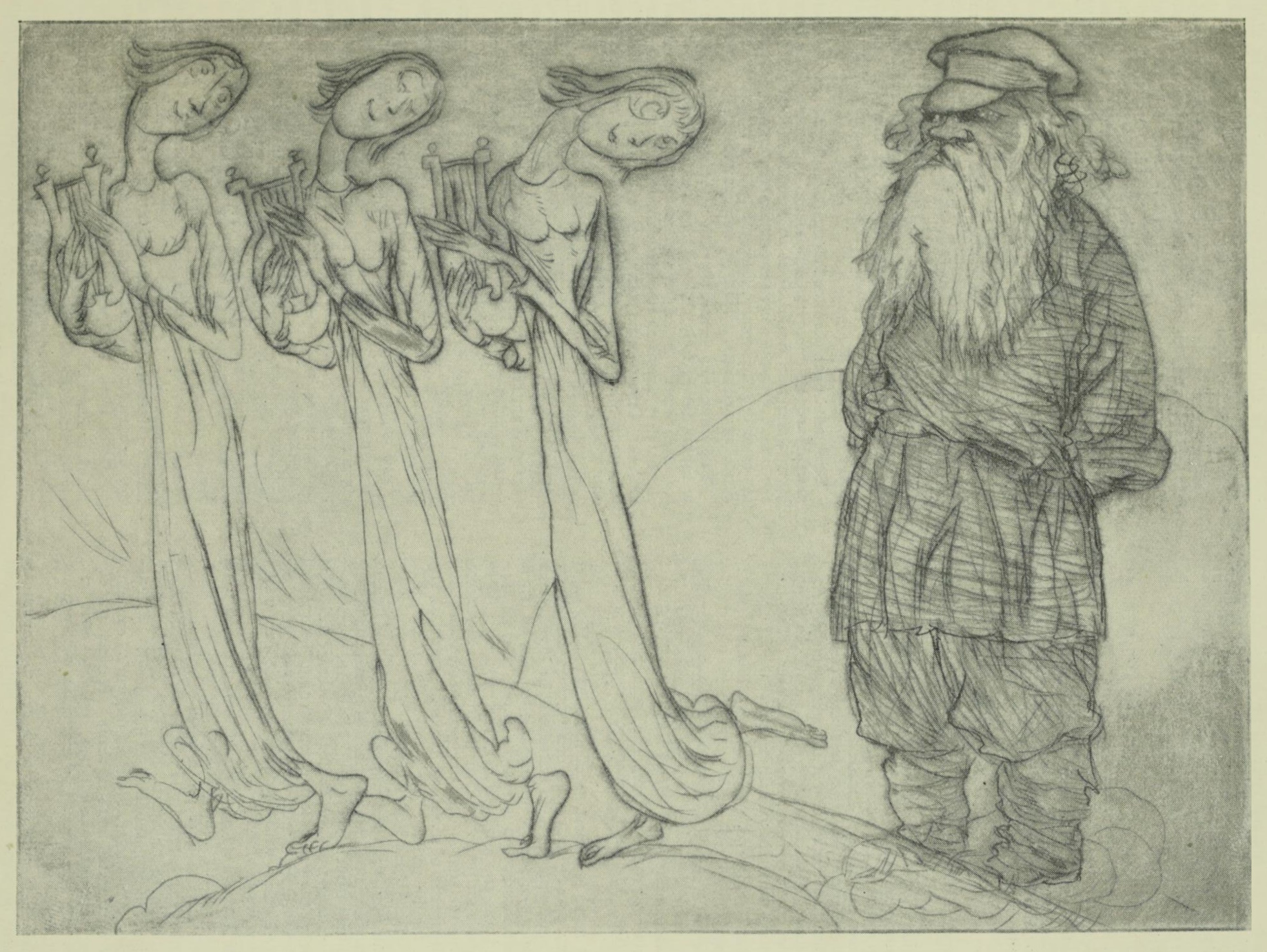
'Our Illustrious Dead No. 1', published in The New Triad, 1 June 1928 (featuring Leo Tolstoy).

== Notes ==
A.The Prehistoric Order of Cannibals (also known as the Cannibal Club) was founded in George Coates' studio over Peppas' fruit shop in Swanston Street, Melbourne.

B.In 1929, a decade after the end of World War I, Sir John Monash, commander of the Australian Corps during the war, made a public comment about the appearance of the typical Australian soldier: "In the matter of looks the Digger is mostly a sweet-faced, round-faced mumma's boy". He added: "And that sweet, round face of his tricked more than one unhappy warrior on the other side". Monash was critical of the depictions of the Australian 'digger' by artists such as Dyson and Norman Lindsay, claiming: "They make him a gaunt, haggard man with harshness written on every facial line". Dyson countered Monash's comments in an article published in Melbourne's Herald newspaper. He stated that what he wished to convey "in the faces of the A.I.F. was the human face under the stress of spiritual and physical conditions of such a character, that any element of the pretty-pretty in them would have been an untruth and an offence". Dyson maintained that his attitude to the Australian soldiers "was one of affection, bordering on worship", adding: "If I failed to make the digger look an heroic figure I am content to let it rest at that, but in my own way I tried to make him as heroic as I felt him, and in the way I felt it".
