= C. R. Bradish =

Charles Richard Bradish (21 April 1884 – 28 July 1961) was an Australian journalist, who mostly published as C. R. Bradish, but also as Caleb Mortimer in The Home and Quinton Davis in The Triad.

== History ==
Bradish was born in Ballarat, Victoria, a son of John Richard Bradish (died 7 November 1923) and Susan Doorne Bradish, née Olney (died 1943), who married in 1883.

In 1924 Bradish was appointed associate editor of a reimagined Melbourne Punch, whose first issue appeared on 18 December 1924. The editor was John B. Dalley and staff included Kenneth Slessor and Hugh McCrae. A year later it was absorbed into Table Talk.

In 1933 he was appointed to the Victorian Railways Publicity department. He retired from the Railways, as assistant publicity officer, in February 1948.

Bradish died on 28 July 1961 at Caritas Christi Kew.

== Publications ==
As "Caleb Mortimer" In The Home

- "Melbourne Theatres" review of The Touch of Silk (Betty M. Davies) vol. 10 no. 1 (p. 18) 2 January 1929
- "We Have Come to Several Conclusions" (prose humour) vol. 10 no. 7 (p. 50, 87) 1 July 1929
- "Cities and Ladies" (prose travel) vol. 14 no. 5 (p. 29, 72) 1 May 1933
- "The Most Fetching Woman in London" (prose humour) vol. 14 no. 6 (p. 37, 78) 1 June 1933
- "The Real Australian" (prose travel) vol. 14 no. 9 (p. 45) 1 September 1933

also

- "The Singular Lindsay Record". The Sydney Morning Herald. No. 36, 455. New South Wales, Australia. 23 October 1954. p. 8 – via National Library of Australia.
- "A Wizard With Trains". The Sydney Morning Herald. No. 36, 401. New South Wales, Australia. 21 August 1954. p. 10 – via National Library of Australia.
- "Max Meldrum, the Art Dissenter". The Sydney Morning Herald. No. 36, 365. New South Wales, Australia. 10 July 1954. p. 9 – via National Library of Australia.
- "The Man Who Created "Tatts"". The Sydney Morning Herald. No. 36, 357. New South Wales, Australia. 1 July 1954. p. 10 – via National Library of Australia.
- "Frugal Bachelor's Great Bequest". The Sydney Morning Herald. No. 36, 347. New South Wales, Australia. 19 June 1954. p. 9 – via National Library of Australia. Story of Alfred Felton
- "Lotteries Go Back A Long Way". The Sydney Morning Herald. No. 36, 295. New South Wales, Australia. 20 April 1954. p. 11 – via National Library of Australia.
- "Was This Jack The Ripper?". The Sydney Morning Herald. No. 36, 197. New South Wales, Australia. 26 December 1953. p. 9 – via National Library of Australia. Story of Frederick William Deeming (sic)
- "Playboy Of The Poetic World". The Sydney Morning Herald. No. 35, 994. New South Wales, Australia. 2 May 1953. p. 9 – via National Library of Australia. Story of Hugh McCrae
- "Pioneers of Australian Art". The Sydney Morning Herald. 13 December 1952. p. 7. Story of the Archibald Prize

== Family ==
On 25 March 1913 Bradish married Ida Louise Mitchell (died 20 May 1965). They had at least one child

- Robert Richard Bradish (2 July 1918 – ), identified as "salesman" in attestation form

They had a home on Bailey Crescent, Rippon Lea, Victoria, and in 1945 lived at 37 Wellington Street, Kew, Victoria.

Percy Albert Bradish (died 21 January 1973), his only sibling, married Eileen Agnes Hickey (died 13 June 1976) in 1914.
