= Stanley Parker =

Australian artist 1909–1981)

Stanley Parker (1909–1981) was an Australian artist who had a career in London, sketching celebrities for popular magazines.

== Biography ==
According to one authority, Parker was born in England, (Note: Alan McCulloch's Encyclopedia of Australian Art (1968 and later eds.) have him born c. 1908 in Melbourne, visiting Australia in 1952 [sic]; no year of death; repeated elsewhere.) and emigrated with his parents to Melbourne, Australia when quite young. He was educated at Melbourne Grammar School and studied art under W. B. McInnes at the art school of the National Gallery of Victoria.

Among his first commissions was a series of plate illustrations for the monthly magazine Adam and Eve, then he was given permission to sketch Anna Pavlova from the wings of Her Majesty's Theatre; she was reportedly pleased with the result.

From 1929 to 1939 he wrote and illustrated articles on theatrical subjects for Table Talk, firstly interviews with Bernard Heinze and Frank Clewlow. and in 1930 contributed drawings of Roy Bridges, Frederick Head and E. F. Moon, none of them theatrical, to the series Prominent Persons.

Putting the pencil aside, he wrote a burlesque, The Matron of the Mountains (Note: As distinct from The Maid of the Mountains, a popular operetta of the early 20th century, source of the hit song "A Bachelor Gay".) as a fundraiser for children's charities.

On 16 April 1936 he left for London by the Orsova, accompanied by his photographer brother Kenneth Parker, and mother, Mrs Cicely Parker, only intending to stay for six months.

He sent regular reports to Table Talk until that magazine's last issue of 14 September 1939. He drew for Tatler and Bystander, then during WWII wrote and illustrated articles on military figures for The Observer, while Kenneth became resident photographer for the Oxford Playhouse. He drew for the magazine Cherwell and had a three-year contract with Illustrated Sporting and Dramatic News. He created stage sets for Jack Hilton and contributed illustrations to Theatre World from 1937 to 1960.

For much of his time in London, he lived in Oxford, in flats which he decorated himself.

He visited Australia "for family reasons" with his mother and brother Kenneth by the Strathaird in August 1950.
