= John Bede Dalley =

Australian journalist and novelist

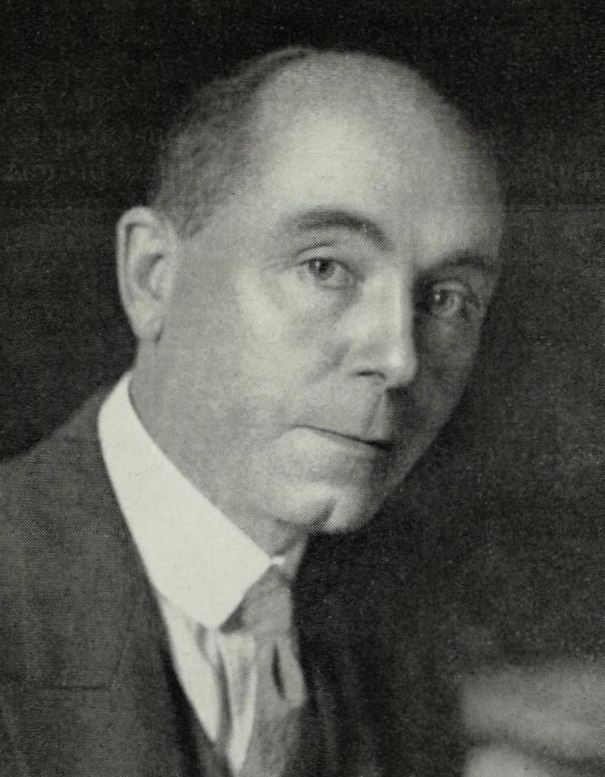
- Portrait of John Bede Dalley, photographed by Harold Cazneaux, published in The Home, December 1921.
- Born: John Bede Polding Dalley; 5 October 1876; Rose Bay, Sydney
- Died: 6 September 1935 (aged 58)
- Education: St. Aloysius' College; St. Augustine's Abbey school Beaumont College; University College, Oxford
- Occupations: journalist, editor, novelist
- Father: William Bede Dalley

John Bede Dalley (5 October 1876 – 6 September 1935) was an Australian journalist, editor and novelist. He had a long-standing association with The Bulletin magazine in Sydney and was also employed as an editor and correspondent with The Herald newspaper group in Melbourne. His published novels took a sardonic view of upper-class Sydney society and the English aristocracy.

John Dalley was born and raised in Sydney, but he and his brothers completed their education in England after the death of their father, a politician and barrister, in 1888. Dalley studied law at Oxford University and was admitted as a barrister in 1901, after which he returned to Australia and practised law in Sydney for about four years. In 1906 he was employed as the editor of the Bathurst newspaper The National Advocate. Apart from the later war years, Dalley remained in the field of journalism for the rest of his life. In 1907 he took up a position as sub-editor at The Bulletin magazine in Sydney. During World War I Dalley served for three years in the A.I.F. in Egypt and France, and on his return to Australia rejoined The Bulletin with writing and editorial duties. In late 1924 he accepted the position of editor of the Melbourne Punch, revitalised after being acquired by The Herald newspaper group. After a year, however, Punch was incorporated into the weekly magazine Table Talk and Dalley left for England where he became the London correspondent for Melbourne's Herald newspaper. In early 1928 his novel No Armour was published in England, soon after which Dalley returned to Sydney and rejoined The Bulletin as an associate-editor. Two more of his novels were published in subsequent years. Dalley died on 6 September 1935, aged 58, after he was washed off a rock platform while fishing at the northern seaside suburb of Avalon.

== Early years ==
John Bede Dalley was born on 5 October 1876 in Rose Bay, Sydney, the third of five children of William Bede Dalley and Eleanor Jane (née Long).^{[A]} His father was a barrister and politician. In January 1881, when John was aged four years, his mother died of typhoid. By late 1886, the health of John's father had begun to suffer, and he largely retired to his home, making only occasional public appearances. William Bede Dalley died in late October 1888 from cardiac disease, renal disease and uraemia, with his death reported as "not altogether unexpected".

John Dalley was initially educated at St. Aloysius' College, a Catholic school in Kirribilli. Following his father's death, John and his brothers were sent to England by their maternal-uncle and principal guardian William Long to complete their schooling (despite their late father's wish for his sons to be educated in Sydney). John attended St. Augustine's Abbey school at Ramsgate, and Beaumont College at Old Windsor, Oxford.

== Legal career ==
Dalley matriculated from University College, Oxford in November 1895. He studied law at Oxford University and was admitted as a student to the Inner Temple in London. During his studies, 'Jack' Dalley and his two brothers enjoyed an active life. In about March 1898 William wrote to Frank Butler, who had been one of the guardians of the three brothers: "We have a good time here with plenty of horses, and lots of riding, fishing, shooting, and hunting".

In October 1899, Dalley's younger brother Charles died after suffering a broken neck from an accident while hunting at Enfield, north of London. John Dalley was riding with his brother when the accident occurred. Charles Dalley's remains were sent to Sydney on the mail steamer Cuzco, accompanied by his brothers William and John, for interment in the family vault at Waverley Cemetery. His funeral was held on 2 January 1900.

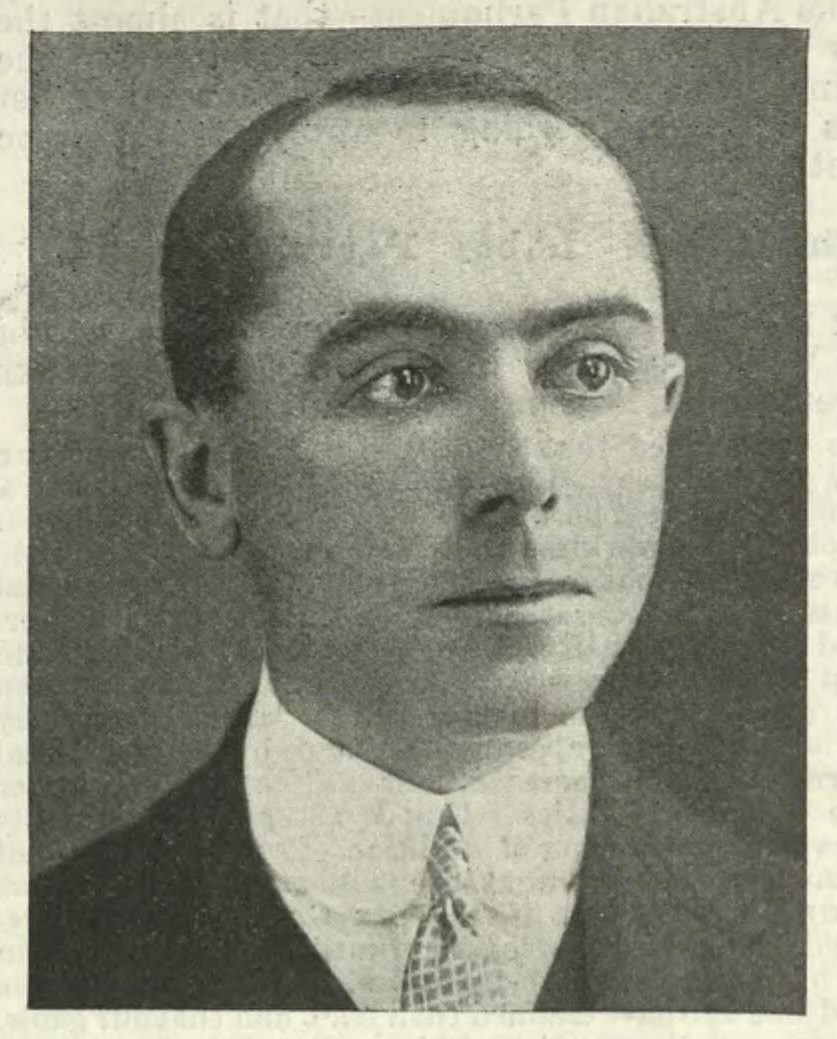
John Bede Dalley, aged about 27 (published in The Bulletin, 19 November 1903).

John Dalley returned to England in May 1900 aboard the mail steamer Arcadia, accompanied by his younger sister Mary. Dalley was called to the Bar in England on 18 November 1901 and soon afterwards he returned to Australia, intending to remain and practise law. John Dalley was admitted to the New South Wales Bar on 10 February 1902. In September 1902 he was appointed as a Crown Prosecutor at the Goulburn Assizes.

Dalley practised for several years at Wigram Chambers in Phillip Street, Sydney, and was a member of the exclusive Union Club.

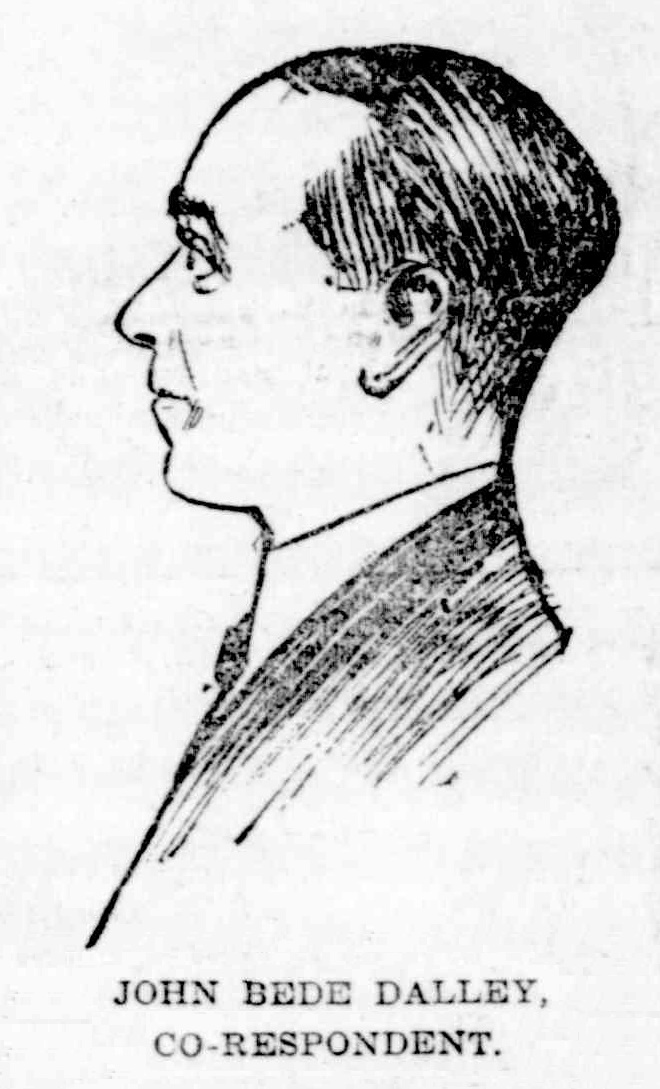
John B. Dalley, co-respondent.

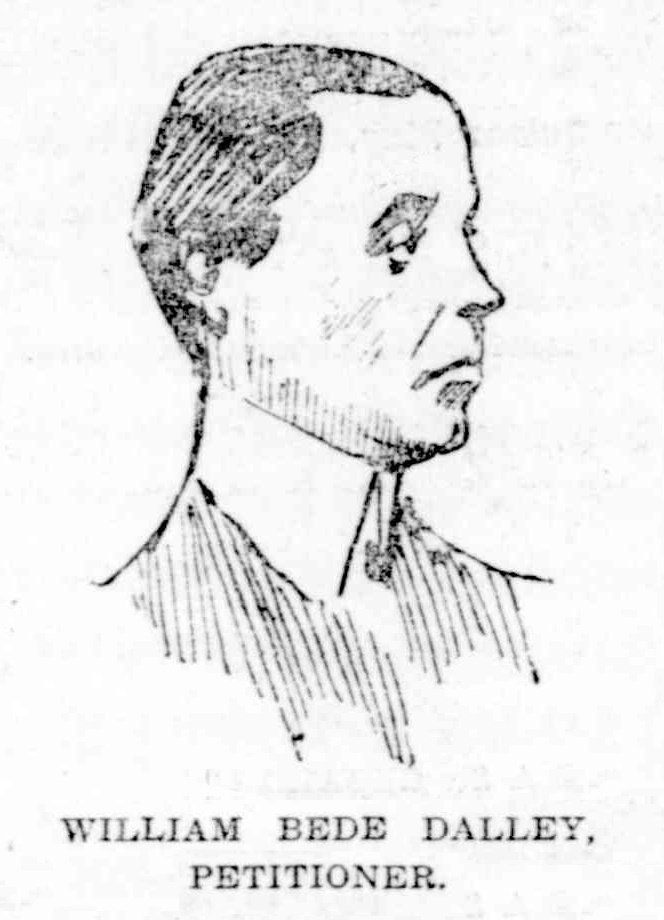
William B. Dalley, petitioner.

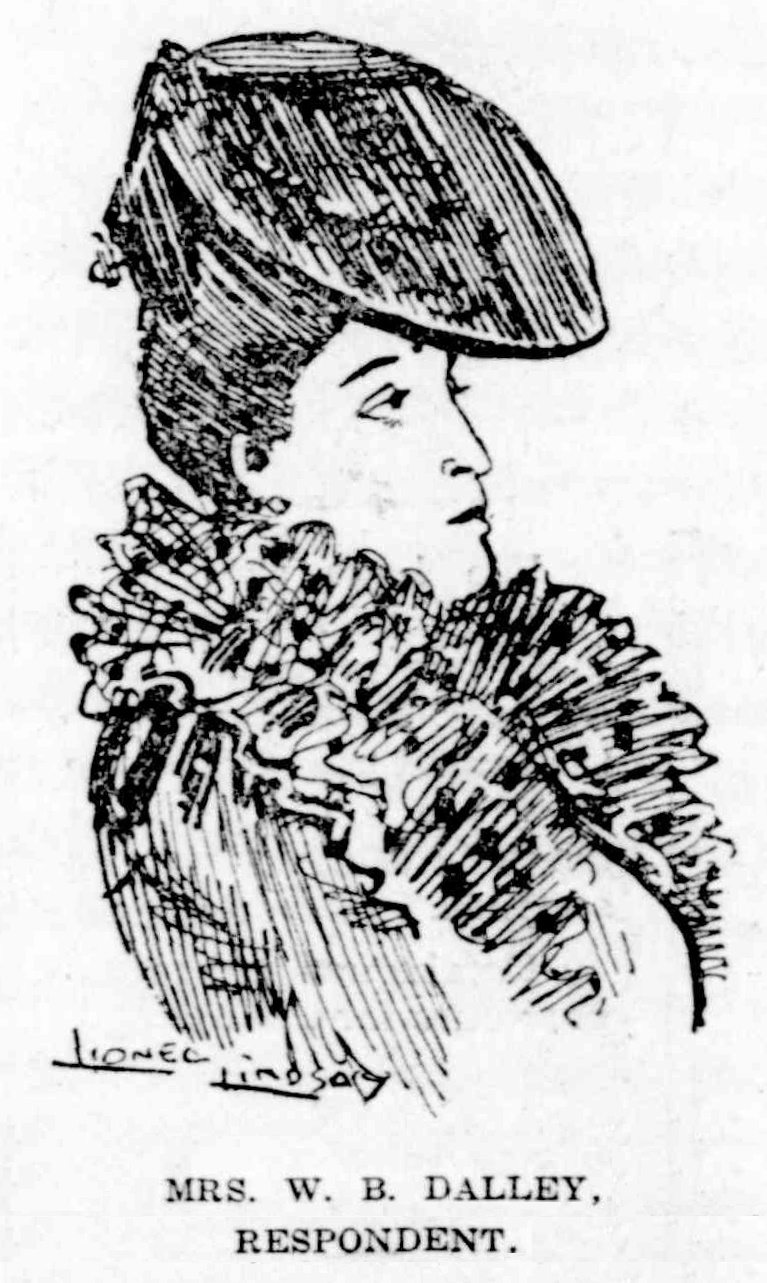
Mrs. W. B. Dalley, respondent.

The principals in the Dalley divorce case; drawings by Lionel Lindsay.

In November 1903, Dalley announced his intention to stand as a candidate for the Protectionist Party in the federal seat of Wentworth. Dalley's opponent, William Kelly, was from the Free Trade Party. At the election held on 16 December 1903 Dalley was defeated, receiving only 28% of the vote.

In Sydney in November 1905, the two Dalley brothers, William and John, were involved in a sensational divorce case between William and his wife Ianthe (née Fattorini), who had been married in August 1895 at Darling Point in Sydney. William Dalley petitioned for the dissolution of his marriage on the ground of his wife's adultery with his brother John (who was named as a co-respondent in the case). William claimed the two had committed adultery in July and August 1900 at Cadenabbia, on the shore of Lake Como in Italy, and from August 1903 to June 1904 at Narrabeen, Pittwater and other locations "in and about Sydney". Ianthe Dalley was also accused of deserting her husband and "connivance". Furthermore, of his wife's two children, William claimed to be the father of only the first child (born in August 1897) and questioned the paternity of the second (born in August 1899). As the respondent, Ianthe Dalley countered with accusations of cruelty and adultery by her husband at various times between 1895 and 1904 with a number of women. William and Ianthe Dalley had separated in 1903. The case was heard over eighteen days before a judge and jury and the details were extensively reported.^{[B]} When the case concluded on 1 December the jury was locked up for twelve hours, after which they advised the judge they "were not prepared to give a verdict on all the issues". The jury reached only one unanimous agreement, that William had committed adultery with a woman named Kitty Cowell during the period 1895 to 1904. In March 1906 a decree nisi for the dissolution of the marriage was granted to Ianthe Dalley. Further litigation followed when Ianthe sought alimony and maintenance for her second child.

John Dalley suffered from hearing loss, a legacy of injuries he had received from falls from a horse while engaged in hunting pursuits. In addition to a fractured knee and a broken collarbones, Dalley had suffered from concussion on three occasions while undertaking the sport in both England and Australia. By about 1906 his persistent deafness prompted his decision to stop practising law and turn to journalism.

== Journalism ==
In March 1906, Dalley was employed as the editor of the Bathurst newspaper, The National Advocate. In April 1907 a commentator writing in the Molong Argus observed: "Mr. Dalley certainly transformed the 'National Advocate' into a bright and readable paper by his trenchant and capable writings – and for a litterateur who had had no previous journalistic experience, he did wonders".

In April 1907, Dalley left Bathurst to take up a position as a sub-editor of The Bulletin magazine in Sydney. By 1911 he was a leader-writer for The Bulletin. Dalley wrote under many noms-de-plume for The Bulletin and was described as an "indefatigable" sub-editor. It was said that Dalley's mode of writing and sub-editing "faithfully echoed the style on which the 'Bulletin' was founded" (described as "that thing of ease, keen edge, and ironic flippancy which was the authentic invention of the 'Bulletin' in the golden age of paragraph-writing").

In February 1914 Dalley was described as "a carefully tailored little man [who] is a social favourite", combining "the role of man-about-town and sub-editor of the 'Bulletin' with great dexterity". He was also described as "the complete cosmopolite, immaculately-dressed, perfectly-spoken [and] courteously-mannered".

In about April 1913, Hugh Ward, the managing director of the J. C. Williamson theatrical company, suggested to Dalley that he should write a theatrical revue similar to such productions in Europe and America, but with an Australian scenario, with local characters and settings. Ward proposed that Dalley provide the text and scenes, to which a producer could introduce "ballets, choruses, and other special turns", with the object of staging the revue if it proved suitable. Dalley collaborated in this task with Ernest O'Ferrall, a writer and poet using the pseudonym 'Kodak'. The two men wrote a revue over several months entitled 'Have You Seen Bodger?', which was set in Sydney with a scenario including references to "many topical allusions, local events and well-known citizens". The manuscript was handed over to Ward in about early August 1913. Shortly afterwards Ward informed Dalley that the J. C. Williamson company had purchased the performing rights of a London revue entitled 'Come Over Here', intending to stage it in Sydney. Ward intimated that if 'Come Over Here' proved successful the company would afterwards stage the revue written by Dalley and O'Ferrall. After "Come Over Here' opened at Her Majesty's Theatre in Sydney on 20 December 1913 it became apparent to the two writers that the company had inserted sections from their own revue into the production, thereby "substantially and materially" plagiarising their work. By doing so, the writers claimed that this "greatly enhanced the value" of 'Come Over Here' and devalued their written revue. Dalley and O'Ferrall made application in the Equity Court seeking a commission to examine witnesses regarding the alleged plagiarism. The application was successful and the commission commenced before a barrister on 11 February 1914. In a settlement arrived at in early-April 1914, Dalley and O'Ferrall each received compensation of £350 for their work.

== War service ==
In March 1915, Dalley received a commission as a second lieutenant in the Australian Field Artillery, part of the local militia force. He enlisted in the Australian Imperial Force (A.I.F.) in November and was placed in the 2nd Divisional Ammunition Column as a first lieutenant. He was mobilised to Egypt, arriving there from Melbourne aboard the Wiltshire on 18 December 1915. In February Dalley was hospitalised at Heliopolis (near Cairo) with paratyphoid fever. In March 1916 Dalley was transferred to the 5th Divisional Artillery, based at Tell El Kebir in Egypt, but soon afterwards the medical board recommended his discharge from the army as permanently unfit because of his deafness. In April he was sent back to Australia aboard the troopship Karoola.

In Australia, Dalley "made a strong personal appeal to the Government" to reverse the decision that he was unsuitable for war service due to his deafness. He pleaded that "no son of the man who had sent the first Australian troops abroad should be denied entry to the A.I.F.".^{[C]} Dalley managed to persuade the military authorities of his suitability for service and the decision to declare him unfit was reversed. He embarked from Sydney aboard the steamship Aeneas which arrived in England in November 1916. He was sent to the war-front in France in October 1917, where he served with the 6th Field Artillery Brigade. Dalley's deafness was too much of a handicap for commanding guns in action, so his services were utilised in the Ammunition Column. The commander of the 6th Brigade, Colonel Harold Cohen, later recounted that Dalley, who was older than his fellow officers, "had a mature mind and an independence of spirit which did not easily accommodate themselves to military surroundings and routine", though he was able to "practise self-discipline". Cohen developed "a great affection" for Dalley, "for his courage, his wit and also his kindness to any of the rank and file who was in trouble". On a number of occasions Dalley used his legal training to act as an advocate for soldiers facing disciplinary action, including providing legal representations at court-martial proceedings.

During his military service, Dalley contributed to Aussie: The Australian Soldiers' Magazine, printed in the field on the Western Front during World War One. In March 1918 Dalley was hospitalised in France with defective vision, but soon afterwards rejoined his unit. He returned to England on leave in August 1918 and several weeks later he was again invalided to Australia due to his deafness. Dalley arrived back at Melbourne aboard the H.M.A.T. Arawa in November.

== Post-war years ==
After returning from the war Dalley rejoined The Bulletin.

On 7 May 1919, John Dalley married Sarah Ann Sharpe (née Bright), a New Zealand-born divorcee who managed a costume business. The couple married in a registry office at Paddington in Sydney.

A novel by John Dalley called The Careerist was serialised in the high-quality quarterly magazine The Home: An Australian Quarterly from December 1921 to December 1922. In 1922 the Evening News newspaper purchased the Australian serial rights for a novel written by Dalley called Indian Summer (with the subtitles An Australian Novel and Life in Sydney Society). The novel was serialised in the Evening News and Sunday News newspapers, published in instalments from 13 September to 13 October 1922.

In the Divorce Court on 1 August 1924, Dalley petitioned for the restitution of conjugal rights on the part of his wife, Sarah Ann. The judge made an order directing her "to return to her husband". When Sarah refused to comply with the restitution order a decree nisi was granted in November 1924 on the ground of desertion. The divorce was finalised in June 1925.

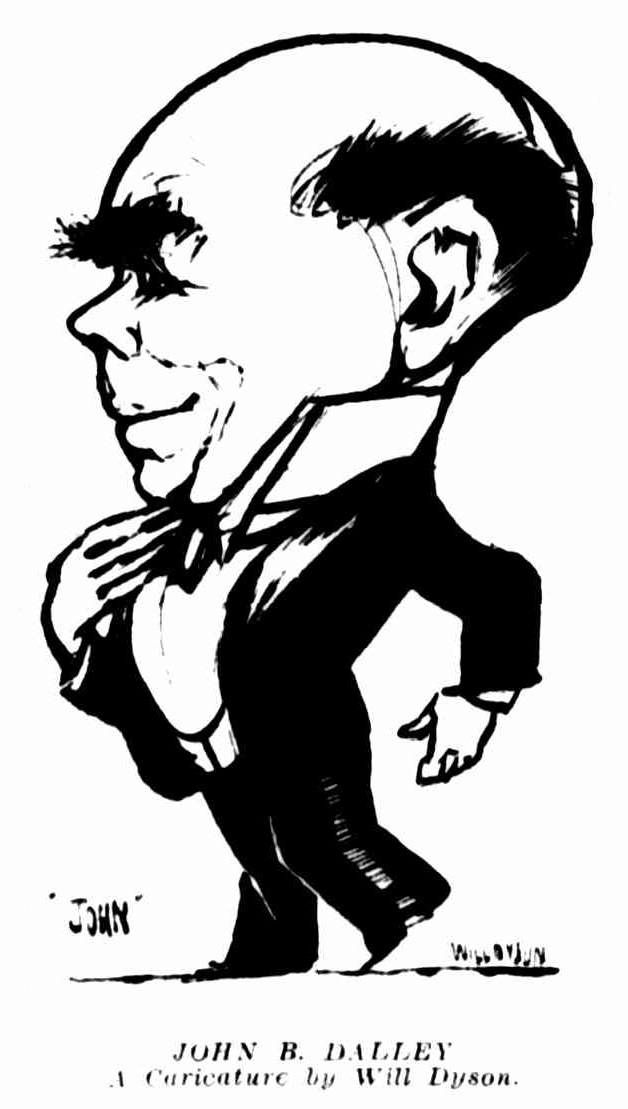
Caricature of John B. Dalley by Will Dyson, published in The Herald, 24 March 1928.

In December 1924, the revitalised Melbourne Punch, acquired by The Herald and Weekly Times newspaper group, was launched with Dalley as the editor. The newspaper had an expanded format and a new cohort of literary and artistic staff-members including Percy Leason (chief cartoonist) and the writers Hugh McCrae and Kenneth Slessor.

The Australian artist Will Dyson, who had achieved international recognition as a political cartoonist in London, was induced back to Australia by Keith Murdoch, editor of The Herald newspaper, to join Percy Leason as a staff cartoonist for Punch. Dyson returned to Melbourne in March 1925. As editor, Dalley was willing to give Dyson full freedom to express himself, but the proprietors of the journal exerted pressure to limit his social and political satire. Eventually "Dyson was edged from his special field into the production of pleasant comic drawings, and he finally accepted this role of entertainer with a wry resignation".

In December 1925, Punch was incorporated into the weekly magazine, Table Talk (which had been acquired by the Herald group in 1924). In January 1926 it was reported that Dalley was to take up a newspaper position in London.

In late January 1926, on the eve of his departure for England, Dalley was involved in an accident at Sorrento, on the Mornington Peninsula near Melbourne. As he was stepping into a motor-car he was knocked off the running board by a passing car and received a deep wound to his temple. He was brought to Melbourne by ambulance after the incident. After he recovered Dalley left Australia to become the London correspondent for The Herald newspaper group. He arrived in London by May 1926 after which his reports began to be published in Melbourne's The Herald and Table Talk.

In early 1928, Dalley's novel called No Armour was published by John Long Ltd. in London. Dalley's novel was primarily set amongst the affluent social life of Sydney. By the end of February 1928 the third edition of No Armour had sold out in England (with the printing eventually running to six editions). It was released in Australia in March 1928.

Dalley returned to Sydney in July 1928 to take up a position with The Bulletin, employed as an associate-editor. He also worked as the Sydney correspondent for The Herald in Melbourne. Dalley's writing style was described as belonging "to a literary half-world, the territory between the fringes of journalism and literature", a rarity "in the factory-made atmosphere of modern newspapers". Dalley was described as "an all-rounder" in respect of the variety of his contributions during his periods of employment at The Bulletin. By the time of his death in 1935 Dalley was recognised as the oldest member of The Bulletin's literary staff, having been first employed by the magazine in 1907.

John Dalley and Claire Scott were married on 8 November 1928 in St. Stephen's Presbyterian church at Wooloomooloo. After their marriage the couple resided at a flat at Kelburn Hall in Elizabeth Bay. Claire was an artist who had been on the staff of Punch in 1924. She designed the book jackets of Dalley's novels, beginning with No Armour published in early 1928.

In early 1929, John Long Ltd. published Dalley's novel, Max Flambard in England. The novel's synopsis was described as "a masterly account of the incompatibility of the self-made millionaire with his English wife of a noble family: social life on board ship: and the seamy side of journalism in an Australian suburban village". Dalley's novel Only the Morning was published in 1930. The synopsis was described as: "The story of a self-made Australian, who starts life in Sydney as a clerk, and ends as a multi-millionaire, which deals convincingly with his relations with the Mother Country, and the problem of his children, brought up in England, and given an entirely different outlook and environment from his own". Dalley's published novels, drawing upon his own experiences, took a distinctly sardonic view of upper-class Sydney society and the English aristocracy.

== Death ==
On Friday, 6 September 1935, Dalley left The Bulletin offices with the intention of going fishing at the northern seaside suburb of Avalon. His wife and child were spending the weekend at Kurrajong, on the lower slopes of the Blue Mountains west of Sydney, with Dalley intending to join them later. By the following Monday, after Claire Dalley fully realised that her husband was missing, she informed the Narrabeen police who found Dalley's unoccupied car on the Avalon headland. A search was instigated but no sign of the journalist was found and it was feared he had been washed from the rocks below the headland while fishing and subsequently drowned.

John B. Dalley's remains were never found. In May 1936, he was officially declared to be deceased.

== Publications ==
- The Careerist (1921-2), serialised in The Home: An Australian Quarterly, December 1921 to 1922.
- Indian Summer (1922), serialised in the Evening News and Sunday News from 13 September to 13 October 1922.
- The Libertine: With a Gentle Tracing of his Path of Dalliance (1923), a short story published in The Home: An Australian Quarterly, June 1923.
- The Burglaries at "Mon Repos" (1925), a short story published in Punch (Melbourne), 10 December 1925 (with illustrations by Will Dyson).
- No Armour (1928), London: John Long Ltd.
- Max Flambard (1928), London: John Long Ltd.
- Only the Morning (1930), London: John Long Ltd.

== Notes ==
A.Dalley's full name was John Bede Polding Dalley, named after John Bede Polding, the first Roman Catholic Archbishop of Sydney.

B.The divorce case between William B. Dalley and Ianthe Dalley was heard over nineteen sitting days from 6 November to 1 December 1905. The evidence presented each day was reported in detail in Sydney's Evening News newspaper: day one; day two; day three; day four; day five; day six; day seven; day eight; day nine; day ten; day eleven; day twelve; day thirteen; day fourteen; day fifteen; day sixteen; day seventeen; day eighteen and day nineteen. In the end the jury were unable to agree.

C.In February 1885 Dalley's father, William Bede Dalley, was serving as the acting-Premier of New South Wales during the absence of Alexander Stuart from the colony. News had reached Sydney of the fall of Khartoum and the death of General Charles Gordon in Sudan, upon which the colonial government offered a detachment of New South Wales troops to serve with British troops as part of the Suakin Expedition to curb the insurrection and protect British interests in the region. The New South Wales Contingent was the first military force to be raised and deployed overseas by an Australian colony.
