= Table Talk (magazine) =

Australian newspaper

Table Talk: A Journal for Men and Women, was a weekly magazine published from 26 June 1885 until September 1939 in Melbourne, Australia. It was established in 1885 by Maurice Brodzky (1847–1919), who obtained financial assistance to start his own publication after resigning from The Herald.

Table Talk was a social magazine that catered for both male and female readers. It included articles about politics, finance, literature, arts and social notes. Its gossip style attracted readers with articles about local notables and famous people from overseas, commenting on, among other things, their fashions, relationships, and social engagements. It was most popular during the 1880s Land Boom in Melbourne.

Brodsky became aware of the machinations of the land boom era figures, and Table Talk began to carry accurate reports of their activities.

In 1893, trade unionist Frederick Bromley sued Brodzky after Table Talk drew public attention to the link between himself and George Sangster, who had illegally used union funds. The jury found for Bromley, awarding him £500 damages, and Brodzky left for America. G. V. Allen took over as proprietor and publisher, to the disgust of at least one commentator.

In 1899, the format of Table Talk changed to include photographs and different font sizes. It had a folio-size format, and initially was 16 pages, increasing to 20 pages by 1885, and was 24 pages by 1888. It was initially sold for threepence but the price had increased to sixpence by 1903.

In September 1924, Table Talk was sold for a reported £15,000. In 1926, it absorbed the illustrated magazine Punch. The last issue was dated 7 September 1939.

== "Prominent Persons" ==
"Prominent Persons" was a long-running feature on currently notable people: a biography or character study accompanied by a commissioned portrait, often caricature, by a Melbourne artist, usually Will Dyson or L. F. Reynolds.

L. F. Reynolds (left blank in "Artist" column) or Will Dyson (marked WD) but also Sam G. Wells (SGW) of The Herald or Stanley Parker (SP), best known for show business caricatures. Some articles are credited to C. R. Bradish; others have no byline, so may be by the same person.
Copyright on works by Dyson and Reynolds has expired in the USA, as both artists died more than 70 years ago (21 August 1939 and 21 January 1938 respectively). Sam Wells died 12 March 1972 and Parker in 1981, so their post-1929 works are not freely available.

	Date	Artist	Subject	Notes
	17 Dec 1925	WD	Gerald Patterson	
	24 Dec 1925	WD	George Tallis	MD, J. C. Williamson's
	31 Dec 1925	WD	J. C. Boyce	Vic. Tourist Bureau
	7 Jan 1926	WD	Hugh Trumble	
	14 Jan 1926	WD	C. G. Macartney	
	21 Jan 1926	WD	Lord Allenby	
	28 Jan 1926		Littleton Groom	
	4 Feb 1926	WD	William Brunton	used in article
	11 Feb 1926	WD	J. B. Hawkes	used in article
	18 Feb 1926	WD	J. O. Anderson	
	25 Feb 1926	WD	A. W. Keown	Advertising dept, Vic. Railways
	4 Mar 1926	WD	Benjamin Fuller	
	11 Mar 1926	WD	Lee Neil	used in article
	18 Mar 1926	WD	Harrie B. Lee	Fire Chief, Melbourne
	25 Mar 1926		Dion Boucicault	
	1 Apr 1926		John Allan	
	8 Apr 1926	WD	Captain John King Davis	
	15 Apr 1926	WD	Captain G. H. Wilkins	
	22 Apr 1926	WD	Hugh Ward	
	29 Apr 1926	WD	W. T. Conder	used in article
	6 May 1926	WD	E. J. Hogan	
	13 May 1926	WD	A. V. Kewney	
	20 May 1926		H. L. Collins	
	27 May 1926	WD	H. A. Hunt	
	3 Jun 1926	WD	W. J. McClelland	
	10 Jun 1926		W. M. Woodfull	
	17 Jun 1926		Percy Grainger	
	24 Jun 1926	WD	J. M. Gregory	
	1 Jul 1926	WD	Charles Tait	used in article
	8 Jul 1926		Alexander James Peacock	
	15 Jul 1926		Warren Bardsley	
	22 Jul 1926		C. H. Wickens	Commonwealth Statistician
	29 Jul 1926		Arthur Streeton	
	5 Aug 1926		W. S. Littlejohn	
	12 Aug 1926		A. J. Richardson	
	19 Aug 1926		Brudenell White	
	26 Aug 1926		Bernard Heinze	
	2 Sep 1926	WD	Bert Bailey	
	9 Sep 1926		Group Captain Williams	
	16 Sep 1926		Alberto Zelman	used in article
	23 Sep 1926		Leonard Nettlefold	used in article
	30 Sep 1926		Richard Linton	used in article
	7 Oct 1926		Horace Brinsmead	used in article
	14 Oct 1926		J. H. Butters	
	21 Oct 1926		Earle Page	
	28 Oct 1926		Thomas Blamey	
	4 Nov 1926		Donald Mackinnon	
	11 Nov 1926		W. B. McInnes	
	18 Nov 1926		Wirth Brothers	
	25 Nov 1926		Pat O'Hara Wood	
	2 Dec 1926		John Longstaff	
	9 Dec 1926		Stephen "Steve" Morell	mayor of Melbourne
	16 Dec 1926		L. A. Adamson	
	23 Dec 1926		Gregan McMahon	
	30 Dec 1926		Walter Burley Griffin	
	6 Jan 1927		W. A. Gibson	
	13 Jan 1927		Monty Grover	
	20 Jan 1927		W. H. Ponsford	
	27 Jan 1927		James J. Malone	used in article
	3 Feb 1927		W. R. Napier	used in article
	10 Feb 1927		E. T. Fisk	
	17 Feb 1927		Harry Lawson	
	24 Feb 1927		Ivo Whitton	
	3 Mar 1927		George Foster Pearce	
	10 Mar 1927		Allan Wilkie	used in article
	17 Mar 1927		Paul Bibron	ballet dancer
	24 Mar 1927		John Henry MacFarland	used in article
	31 Mar 1927		E. G. Theodore	
	7 Apr 1927		Granville Ryrie	
	14 Apr 1927		Herbert Larkin	used in article
	21 Apr 1927		Maurice Moscovitch	
	28 Apr 1927		Septimus Power	
	5 May 1927		Ivor Warne-Smith	
	12 May 1927		Lord Stonehaven	
	19 May 1927	WD	Paderewski	
	26 May 1927		Fritz Hart	
	2 Jun 1927		Charles A. Wenman	used in article
	9 Jun 1927		Richard Penrose Franklin	used in article
	16 Jun 1927		James Barrett	
	23 Jun 1927		James Francis Guthrie	
	30 Jun 1927		Syd Coventry	
	7 Jul 1927		J. A. Lyons	
	14 Jul 1927		George Lambert	
	21 Jul 1927		T. S. Carlyon	used in article
	28 Jul 1927		O. R. Snowball	
	4 Aug 1927	WD	Efrem Zimbalist	text on next page
	11 Aug 1927		Horrie Clover	
	18 Aug 1927		Tom Tunnecliffe	
	25 Aug 1927		L. K. S. Mackinnon	chairman, VRC
	1 Sep 1927		C. J. Dennis	
	8 Sep 1927		Lawrence Wackett	
	15 Sep 1927		Frank Talbot	used in article
	23 Sep 1927		C. E. Merrett	used in article
	29 Sep 1927		Allan Geddes	misspelled in Table Talk used in article
	6 Oct 1927		Cliff Rankin	
	13 Oct 1927		James Grice	chairman, VATC
	20 Oct 1927		John Lemmon	
	27 Oct 1927		James Scobie	
	3 Nov 1927	WD	Norman McKinnel	
	10 Nov 1927	WD	L. C. M. S. Amery	
	17 Nov 1927		Lord Somers	
	24 Nov 1927		John Tait	used in article
	1 Dec 1927		Jack Ryder	
	8 Dec 1927		Jack Crawford	
	15 Dec 1927		Frank Tate	used in article
	22 Dec 1927		Victor Champion	conductor of theatre orchestra
	29 Dec 1927		Max Howden	pioneer radio amateur
	5 Jan 1928		Jack Ellis	
	12 Jan 1928		William Slater	
	19 Jan 1928		Don Blackie	
	26 Jan 1928	WD	George Beeby	
	2 Feb 1928		Maurice Dudley	actor, 3LO radio announcer
	9 Feb 1928		Herbert Edward Pratten	
	16 Feb 1928		Major de Havilland	
	23 Feb 1928		Jean Borotra	
	1 Mar 1928		Harry Hopman	
	8 Mar 1928		Alexander Cameron	
	15 Mar 1928		W. R. Morris	
	22 Mar 1928		C. H. Book	used in article
	29 Mar 1928		A. E. Koetsveld	chief of detective branch
	5 Apr 1928		Herbert W. Gepp	used in article
	12 April 1928		Stanley Goble	
	19 Apr 1928		William Hindley	used in article
	26 Apr 1928	WD	W. N. Lancaster	
	3 May 1928		H. W. Harrison	used in article
	10 May 1928		Gordon Rattray	
	17 May 1928		Jim Scullin	
	24 May 1928	WD	James Nevin Tait	text on next page
	31 May 1928		J. C. Bancks	
	7 Jun 1928		Andrew Wilkie	used in article
	14 Jun 1928		Dick Taylor	
	21 Jun 1928		George Swinburne	
	28 Jun 1928		Kingsford Smith and C. T. P. Ulm	full page illustration
	5 Jul 1928		John Brownlee	
	12 Jul 1928		W. A. M. Blackett	pres., Institute of Architects
	19 Jul 1928		M. P. Hansen	Director of Education
	26 July 1928		William McPherson	
	2 Aug 1928		J. G. Latham	
	9 Aug 1928		Rupert Bunny	
	16 Aug 1928		Dan Carroll	showman with E. J. Carroll
	23 Aug 1928		W. R. Coleman	stage scene painter
	30 Aug 1928		Gordon Coventry	
	6 Sep 1928		Cecil Newton McKay	son of Hugh Victor McKay
	13 Sep 1928		A. A. Dunstan	
	20 Sep 1928		R. O. Blackwood	
	27 Sep 1928		H. C. A. Harrison	
	4 Oct 1928		William G. James	used in article
	11 Oct 1928		Cardinal Cerretti	
	18 Oct 1928		Ben Chaffey	
	25 Oct 1928		R. M. Cuthbertson	pres., National Federation of Victoria
	1 Nov 1928		W. A. Watt	
	8 Nov 1928		R. D. Elliott	
	15 Nov 1928		G. A. Maxwell	
	22 Nov 1928		J. M. Niall	pastoralist and horse owner
	29 Nov 1928		Harold Luxton	used in article
	6 Dec 1928		Joe Kirkwood Sr.	
	13 Dec 1928	WD	Stanley Argyle	
	20 Dec 1928	WD	Jack Hobbs	
	27 Dec 1928		A. P. F. Chapman	
	3 Jan 1929		W. J. Duggan	used in article
	10 Jan 1929		Alan F. Kippax	
	17 Jan 1929		Ian Macfarlan	writer: P. B. Jenkin
	24 Jan 1929		Frank Beaurepaire	
	31 Jan 1929		Maurice Tate	
	7 Feb 1929		Clarrie Grimmett	writer: E. H. M. Baillie
	14 Feb 1929		Donald Bradman	
	21 Feb 1929		Justice Lukin	
	28 Feb 1929		Lennon Raws	businessman
	7 Mar 1929		Patsy Hendren	
	14 Mar 1929		Alfred Ernest Floyd	organist
	21 Mar 1929		Bob Schlesinger	used in article
	28 Mar 1929		E. J. Holloway	
	4 April 1929		Norman Brearley	
	11 April 1929		H. I. Cohen	used in article
	18 Apr 1929		Charles Marr	
	25 Apr 1929		Robert Menzies	
	2 May 1929		Norris Garrett Bell	Transcontinental Railway
	9 May 1929		Maisie Gay	
	16 May 1929		Herbert Brookes	
	23 May 1929		MacRobertson's	
	30 May 1929		Hamilton Webber	used in article
	6 June 1929	WD	Harold Williams	
	13 June 1929		Anna Pavlova	
	20 June 1929		Albert Chadwick	writer: W. S. Sharland
	27 Jun 1929		R. G. Nichols	used in article
	4 July 1929		Stuart Doyle	used in article
	11 July 1929		Guy Newton Moore	aviation (writer: W. A. Somerset)
	18 July 1929		Harry Lauder	
	25 July 1929		William Glasgow	
	1 Aug 1929		Frederic Truby King	
	8 Aug 1929		Bill Cubbins	writer: Keith Manzie
	15 Aug 1929		J. C. Blair	
	22 Aug 1929		John Sinclair	Presbyterian clergy
	29 Aug 1929		John James Virgo	YMCA executive
	5 Sep 1929		Percy Code	
	12 Sep 1929		Frank Groves	used in article
	19 Sep 1929		Mick Ryan	used in article
	26 Sep 1929		Albert Collier	writer: F. Keith Manzie
	3 Oct 1929		G. S. Maclean	sec., National Federation of Victoria
	10 Oct 1929		Arthur Robinson	
	17 Oct 1929		Gustav Slapoffski	
	24 Oct 1929		A. V. Hiskens	sec., Moonee Valley Racing Club
	31 Oct 1929		Alan Currie	
	7 Nov 1929		E. L. Baillieu	grazier, race horse owner
	14 Nov 1929		Edward Goll	
	21 Nov 1929		E. R. G. R. Evans	writer: Geoffrey Rawson
	28 Nov 1929		Joan Rosanove	used in article
	5 Dec 1929		Bert Ironmonger	
	12 Dec 1929		E. J. Brady	
	19 Dec 1929		Jim Willard	used in article
	26 Dec 1929		J. E. Fenton	
	2 Jan 1930		Dale Collins	
©	9 Jan 1930	SP	Roy Bridges	
	16 Jan 1930		Walter Massy-Greene	
©	23 Jan 1930	SP	Frederick Head	
©	30 Jan 1930	SP	E. F. Moon	
	6 Feb 1930		F. M. Forde	
	13 Feb 1930		V. Y. Richardson	
	20 Feb 1930		Mrs Percy Russell	used in article
	27 Feb 1930		Walter Lindrum	
	6 Mar 1930		E. L. a'Beckett	
	13 Mar 1930		W. L. Kelly	manager, cricket Test team
	20 Mar 1930		Archie Jackson	
	27 Mar 1930		Walter Hagen	
	3 Apr 1930		A. E. Green	
	10 Apr 1930		Harry Chauvel	
	17 Apr 1930		John Cain	
	24 Apr 1930		Douglas Mawson	
	1 May 1930		Like McBrien	used in article
	8 May 1930		C. W. B. Littlejohn	used in article
	15 May 1930		David Orme Masson	
	22 May 1930		W. A. Coxen	
	29 May 1930		Edward Greeves	
	5 Jun 1930		William James Beckett	used in article
	12 Jun 1930		Jack Harris	
	19 Jun 1930		W. V. McCall	
	26 Jun 1930		W. A. Osborne	used in article
	3 Jul 1930		William M. Whyte	used in article
	10 Jul 1930		Florence Austral	
	17 Jul 1930		Hugh D. McIntosh	
	24 Jul 1930		William R. Creswell	
	31 Jul 1930		Stanley Wittman	
	7 Aug 1930		Parker John Moloney	
	14 Aug 1930		W. G. Price	used in article
	21 Aug 1930		Charlie Vaude	comedian, 3DB announcer
	28 Aug 1930		Otto Niemeyer	
	4 Sep 1930		Jan Kubelik	
	11 Sep 1930		Robert Gibson	used in article
	18 Sep 1930		Ray Brew	
	25 Sep 1930		Paul Raphael Montford	
	2 Oct 1930		Arthur Coghlan	used in article
	9 Oct 1930		Syd Coventry and Gordon Coventry	
	16 Oct 1930		Dr Arthur E. Syme; Clive L. Baillieu; Ben Chaffey	used in article
	23 Oct 1930		George A. Julius	
	30 Oct 1930		Alister Clark	used in article
	6 Nov 1930		John Henry; Rupert Greene; J. H. Davis	Judge 1919–1943; Starter 1914–1945; Handicapper 1912–1940
	13 Nov 1930		Isaac Isaacs	13 Nov to 11 Dec misnumbered
	20 Nov 1930		Arthur Mailey	
	27 Nov 1930		Bradman, Woodfull, Grimmett	
	4 Dec 1930		Edward Kenny	sec., Henley Regatta
	11 Dec 1930		John Clemenger	used in article
©	18 Dec 1930	SGW	H. Hopman; Crawford	
©	24 Dec 1930	SGW	Sidney Myer	
©	1 Jan 1931	SGW	Don Bradman; Keith Rigg	
	8 Jan 1931		W. A. Oldfield	
	15 Jan 1931		Frank J. Bennell	ocean yachting
	22 Jan 1931		Bert Ironmonger; Don Blackie	
	29 Jan 1931		James Mitchell; Lionel Hill	
	5 Feb 1931		John Thomas Wilkins	Fire Chief
	12 Feb 1931		Frank Gavan Duffy	
	19 Feb 1931		Joseph Lyons; James Fenton	
	26 Feb 1931		Charles H. Kellaway	
	5 Mar 1931		E. C. Riddle	
	12 Mar 1931		T. W. Bearup	Australian Broadcasting Co.
	19 Mar 1931		John Barnes	
	26 Mar 1931		William Neil McKie	
	2 Apr 1931		Charles Hardy	
	9 Apr 1931		Ernest Turnbull	film distributor
	16 Apr 1931		Robert Baden-Powell	
	23 Apr 1931		Jack Beasley; Jack Lang; Jock Garden	"The Repudiationists"

Table Talk later ran a similar series, titled "Pen, Pencil and Personality".

=== See also ===
- Caricatures by John Henry Chinner (South Australia)
- Caricatures by Low (1915) (Australia and New Zealand)

== Personnel ==
- Eugenia Stone, was a reporter and poet. She married Sir George Doughty on 16 August 1913.
- George Vesey Allen (died 14 November 1913), educated at Prince Alfred College, worked as a journalist with The Daily Telegraph (Melbourne) and The Age before becoming proprietor and publisher in 1905. After quitting journalism, he was the organiser of the Bendigo Exhibition and Launceston Exhibition, before working in the administration section of the Neglected Children's Department of the New South Wales Government. He was author of Sinbad the Sailor, a pantomime.
- Charles Richard Bradish (21 April 1884 – 28 July 1961), journalist, was born in Ballarat, a son of John Richard Bradish (died 1923) and Susan Doorne Bradish, née Olney (died 1943), who married in 1883, and brother of Percy Albert Bradish. In 1933 he was appointed to the Victorian Railways Publicity department. He married Ida Louise Mitchell on 25 March 1913. They had a home on Bailey Crescent, Rippon Lea, Victoria, later 37 Wellington Street, Kew, Victoria.
