= Leonard Frank Reynolds =

Australian cartoonist, illustrator, caricaturist, and painter (1897–1939)

Len Reynolds
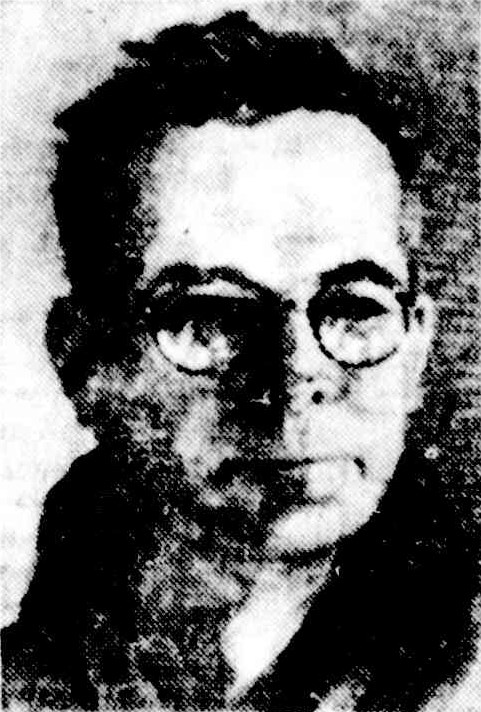
- Self-portrait by Leonard Frank Reynolds (ca. 1939)
- Born: Leonard Frank Reynolds; 3 March 1897; Hobart, Tasmania, Australia
- Died: 21 August 1939 (aged 42); Beaumaris, Victoria, Australia
- Education: Hobart Technical College (now known as TasTAFE)
- Known for: Caricatures

Leonard Frank Reynolds (3 March 1897 – 21 August 1939) was an Australian painter, illustrator, caricaturist, and cartoonist.

== Life ==
Reynolds was the child of Frank Augustus Reynolds and Eleanor Theresa (née Jones) Reynolds. He was educated at The Hutchins School in Hobart.

Reynolds attended Hobart Technical College (now known as TasTAFE) in 1909–12, 1914, and 1918, and he exhibited with the Art Society of Tasmania from 1918–19. He has been variously credited as Len Reynolds, Leonard Reynolds, Leonard F. Reynolds, and L. F. Reynolds. He is well known for his caricatures, including illustrations of Australian General Sir Thomas Blamey; Australian rules footballers Syd and Gordon Coventry; journalist, publicist and playwright Campbell Dixon; and various politicians, including Herbert Pratten.

Reynolds contributed cartoons and caricatures to The Bulletin, Melbourne Punch and the Sun-News Pic. He succeeded J. C. Bancks as illustrator of the column "Mr Melbourne" in the Sun News-Pictorial. He shared, with Will Dyson, the job of illustrating Table Talk magazine's "Prominent Persons" feature 1926–1933. He was also known for his paintings and etchings.

He died at the age of 42 in Beaumaris, Victoria, Australia, when his car went off a cliff. Due to Reynolds' early death, all of his works are public domain.
