= List of Australian films of the 1920s =

This is a list of Australian films of the 1920s. For a complete alphabetical list, see Category:Australian films.

== 1920s ==
Title	Director	Cast	Genre	Notes
1920
The Breaking of the Drought	Franklyn Barrett	Charles Beetham, Rawdon Blandford	Drama	IMDb
Ginger Mick				
The Hordern Mystery				
The Jackeroo of Coolabong	E.J. Carroll, Snowy Baker	Snowy Baker		
The Kelly Gang				
The Man from Snowy River	Beaumont Smith			
On Our Selection	Raymond Longford	Percy Walshe, Tal Ordell, Beatrice Esmond, Arthur Greenaway, Evelyn Johnson, Fred Coleman, Charlotte Beaumont, Arthur Wilson, Olga Willard-Turton (credited as Olga Willard), Nellie Bisellas, Carmen Coleman, David Edelsten		IMDb
Robbery Under Arms				
1921
The Betrayer	Beaumont Smith	Stella Southern, Cyril Mackay, John Cosgrove, Marie D'Alton, Mita, Agnes Vernon, Maggie Papakura, Herbert Lee, Raymond Hatton, Dunstan Webb	Drama	IMDb
The Blue Mountains Mystery	Raymond Longford, Lottie Lyell	Marjorie Osborne, John Faulkner, Vivian Edwards, Agnes Vernon, Billy Williams, Redmond Barry, John De Lacey, Ivy Shilling	Mystery	IMDb
The Gentleman Bushranger				
A Girl of the Bush				
The Guyra Ghost Mystery				
Jasamine Freckel's Love Affair				
Know Thy Child				
The Life Story of John Lee, or The Man They Could Not Hang				
Mated in the Wilds				
Pearls and Savages	Frank Hurley			
Possum Paddock				
Retribution				
The Ross Smith Flight	Frank Hurley			NFSA
Rudd's New Selection	Raymond Longford			
Silks and Saddles				
While the Billy Boils	Beaumont Smith	Tal Ordell, John Cosgrove, Robert MacKinnon, Ernest T. Hearne, Gilbert Emery, J.P. O'Neill, Charles Beetham, Alf Scarlett, Elsie McCormack, Loma Lantaur, Rita Aslim, May Renne, James Ward, Charles Villiers, Henry Lawson		
1922
A Daughter of Australia				
Circumstance	Lawson Harris			
East Lynne				
The Lust for Gold				
A Rough Passage				
Sunshine Sally				
The Tale of a Shirt				
The Triumph of Love				
Why Men Go Wrong	Walter Hunt	Horace George, Anna Hansen, Thelma Raye	Short/Comedy	IMDb
1923
The Dingo				
The Dinkum Bloke				
Prehistoric Hayseeds	Beaumont Smith			
Should a Doctor Tell?				
Townies and Hayseeds	Beaumont Smith			
The Twins				
When the Kellys Were Out	Harry Southwell	Godfrey Cass, William Ellison, Rose Rooney, Harry Southwell, Charles Villiers	Drama/Thriller	IMDb
With the Headhunters in Papua	Frank Hurley			see Pearls and Savages
1924
Australia Calls	Raymond Longford		Docudrama	IMDb
Daughter of the East				
David	Harry Southwell			IMDb
The Digger Earl				
Dope				
Fisher's Ghost				
How McDougall Topped the Score				
Hullo Marmaduke	Beaumont Smith			
Joe				
The Price				
The Rev. Dell's Secret	P.J. Ramster			
1925
The Adventures of Algy	Beaumont Smith	Claude Dampier, Bathie Stuart, Eric Harrison, Billie Carlisle, George Chalmers	Comedy/Drama	IMDb
Annette Kellerman Performing Water Ballet			Short/Documentary	IMDb
Around the Boree Log	Phil Walsh			IMDb
The Bushwhackers				
Jewelled Nights				
Le Juif polonais	Harry Southwell			IMDb
The Mystery of a Hansom Cab				
Painted Daughters				
The Rancher's Daughter	Harry Peake			IMDb
Those Terrible Twins				
1926
Greenhide				
Hills of Hate				
Jungle Woman				
The Moth of Moonbi	Charles Chauvel			
Peter Vernon's Silence				
The Pioneers				
The Sealed Room				
Should a Girl Propose?				
Sydney's Darlings				
Tall Timber				
The Tenth Straw				
Those Who Love	Paulette McDonagh; P. J. Ramster	Marie Lorraine; William Carter	Drama	IMDb
1927
Down Under				
Environment				
For the Term of his Natural Life	Norman Dawn	George Fisher, Eva Novak	Adventure	IMDb
The Kid Stakes	Tal Ordell	Frank Boyd	Comedy	
The Man Who Forgot				
The Miner's Daughter				
The Northbound Limited				
The Rushing Tide				
1928
The Adorable Outcast	Norman Dawn	Edith Roberts, Edmund Burns, Walter Long, Jessica Harcourt, Jack Gavin, Katherine Dawn, Arthur McLaglen, Arthur Tauchert, Fred Twitcham, Compton Coutts, William O'Hanlon, Claude Turton, Charles Weatherby, Tom Dalton, Walter Hunt		IMDb
The Birth of White Australia	Phil Walsh			IMDb
Caught in the Net				
The Devil's Playground				
The Exploits of the Emden				
The Far Paradise	Paulette McDonagh	Marie Lorraine, Gaston Mervale	Drama	IMDb
The Grey Glove				
The Menace				
Odds On				
The Romance of Runnibede				
The Russell Affair				
The Shattered Illusion				
The Spirit of Gallipoli				
Trooper O'Brien				
The Unsleeping Eye	Alexander MacDonald	Wendy Osborne, Len Norman	Drama	IMDb
1929
The Kingdom of Twilight				

== See also ==
- 1920 in Australia
- 1921 in Australia
- 1922 in Australia
- 1923 in Australia
- 1924 in Australia
- 1925 in Australia
- 1926 in Australia
- 1927 in Australia
- 1928 in Australia
- 1929 in Australia
