= 1925 in Australia =

- Decades: 1900s; 1910s; 1920s; 1930s; 1940s
- See also: 1925 in Australian literature; Other events of 1925; Federal election; Timeline of Australian history

The following lists events that happened during 1925 in Australia.

1925 in Australia
- Monarch: George V
- Governor-General: Henry Forster, then John Baird
- Prime minister: Stanley Bruce
- Population: 5,939,231
- Elections: Federal, Tasmania, New South Wales

== Incumbents ==
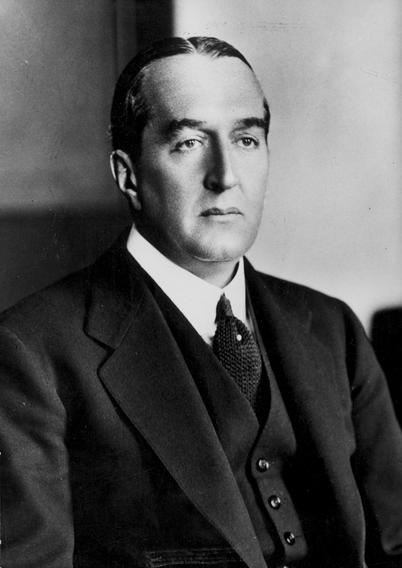
Stanley Bruce

- Monarch – George V
- Governor-General – Henry Forster, 1st Baron Forster (until 8 October) then John Baird, 1st Viscount Stonehaven
- Prime Minister – Stanley Bruce
- Chief Justice – Adrian Knox

=== State premiers ===
- Premier of New South Wales – George Fuller (until 17 June), then Jack Lang
- Premier of Queensland – Ted Theodore (until 26 February), then William Gillies (until 22 October), then William McCormack
- Premier of South Australia – John Gunn
- Premier of Tasmania – Joseph Lyons
- Premier of Victoria – John Allan
- Premier of Western Australia – Philip Collier

=== State governors ===
- Governor of New South Wales – Sir Dudley de Chair
- Governor of Queensland – Sir Matthew Nathan (until 17 September)
- Governor of South Australia – Sir Tom Bridges
- Governor of Tasmania – Sir James O'Grady
- Governor of Victoria – George Rous, 3rd Earl of Stradbroke
- Governor of Western Australia – Sir William Campion

== Events ==
- 26 January – Australia's oldest commercial radio station, 2UE, begins broadcasting in Sydney.
- 20 May – The Murrumbidgee River floods for eight days killing four people, as up to 500 millimetres (20 in) falls in its upper catchment.
- 30 May – Millicent Preston-Stanley becomes the first woman member of the New South Wales Legislative Assembly.
- 1 to 31 May – Canberra records its wettest month on record with 339.4 millimetres (13.36 in) at Acton and 297.4 millimetres (11.71 in) at Duntroon Military College.
- 3 June – A general election is held in Tasmania. The Labor government of Joseph Lyons is returned in a landslide victory.
- 9 June – Ten people are killed in a derailment near Traveston railway station, Queensland
- 1 September – Thomas Blamey becomes Chief Commissioner of Victoria Police.

== Science and technology ==
- The Cactoblastis moth is introduced in Queensland to control prickly pear cactus.

== Arts and literature ==
- John Longstaff wins the Archibald Prize for his portrait of Maurice Moscovitch

== Sport ==
- Victoria wins the Sheffield Shield
- 2 May – Footscray, Hawthorn and North Melbourne play their initial Victorian Football League matches.
- 8 August – South Sydney record the only perfect season in NSWRFL history, winning all twelve of their matches.
- 26 September – Geelong defeats Collingwood 10.19 (79) to 9.15 (69), becoming premiers of the 1925 VFL season.
- 3 November – Windbag wins the Melbourne Cup.

== Births ==
- 14 January – Ray Wilkie, meteorologist (d. 2023)
- 8 February – Francis Webb, poet (d. 1973)
- 10 February – Basil Hennessy, archaeologist (d. 2013)
- 11 February – George Avery, Olympic triple jumper (d. 2006)
- 12 February – Ted Innes, politician (d. 2010)
- 17 February – Joy Nichols, comedian and actress (d. 1992)
- 20 February – Pat Lanigan, public servant (d. 1992)
- 19 March – Creighton Burns, journalist and editor-in-chief of The Age (d. 2008)
- 27 March – Ian Robinson, politician (d. 2017)
- 4 April – Dorothy Alison, actress (d. 1992)
- 21 April – Anthony Mason, Chief Justice of the High Court (d. 2026)
- 2 May – Lou Rowan, Test cricket match umpire (d. 2017)
- 19 May – Brian Moll, character actor, director and producer (d. 2010)
- 24 May – Alfred Parsons, diplomat (d. 2010)
- 3 June – David Evans, air marshal (d. 2020)
- 4 June – Peter Benjamin Graham, artist (d. 1987)
- 3 July – Terry Moriarty, Australian rules footballer (d. 2011)
- 6 July – Ruth Cracknell, actor (d. 2002)
- 18 July
  - Raymond Jones, architect (d. 2022)
  - Shirley Strickland, athlete (d. 2004)
- 26 July – Neil O'Reilly, Australian rules footballer (d. 1985)
- 19 August – Laurie Sawle, cricketer (d. 2022)
- 21 August – Don Chipp, politician and founder of the Australian Democrats (d. 2006)
- 24 August – Duncan Hall, rugby league footballer of the 1940s and 1950s (d. 2011)
- 27 August – Fred Emery, psychologist (d. 1997)
- 27 August – Ken Grieves, cricketer (d. 1992)
- 27 August – Bill Neilson, Premier of Tasmania (1975–1977) (d. 1989)
- 24 September – Harry Jenkins (senior), politician (d. 2004)
- 4 October – Renfrey Potts, mathematician (d. 2005)
- 5 October – Murray Riley, Olympic rower (d. 2020)
- 18 October – Thomas Millar, historian (d. 1994)
- 24 October – Ken Mackay, cricketer (d. 1982)
- 5 November – Rhonda Small, filmmaker (d. 2014)
- 17 November – Charles Mackerras, conductor (d. 2010)
- 23 November – James Killen, politician (d. 2007)
- 10 December – Norm McDonald, Australian rules footballer (d. 2002)

== Deaths ==
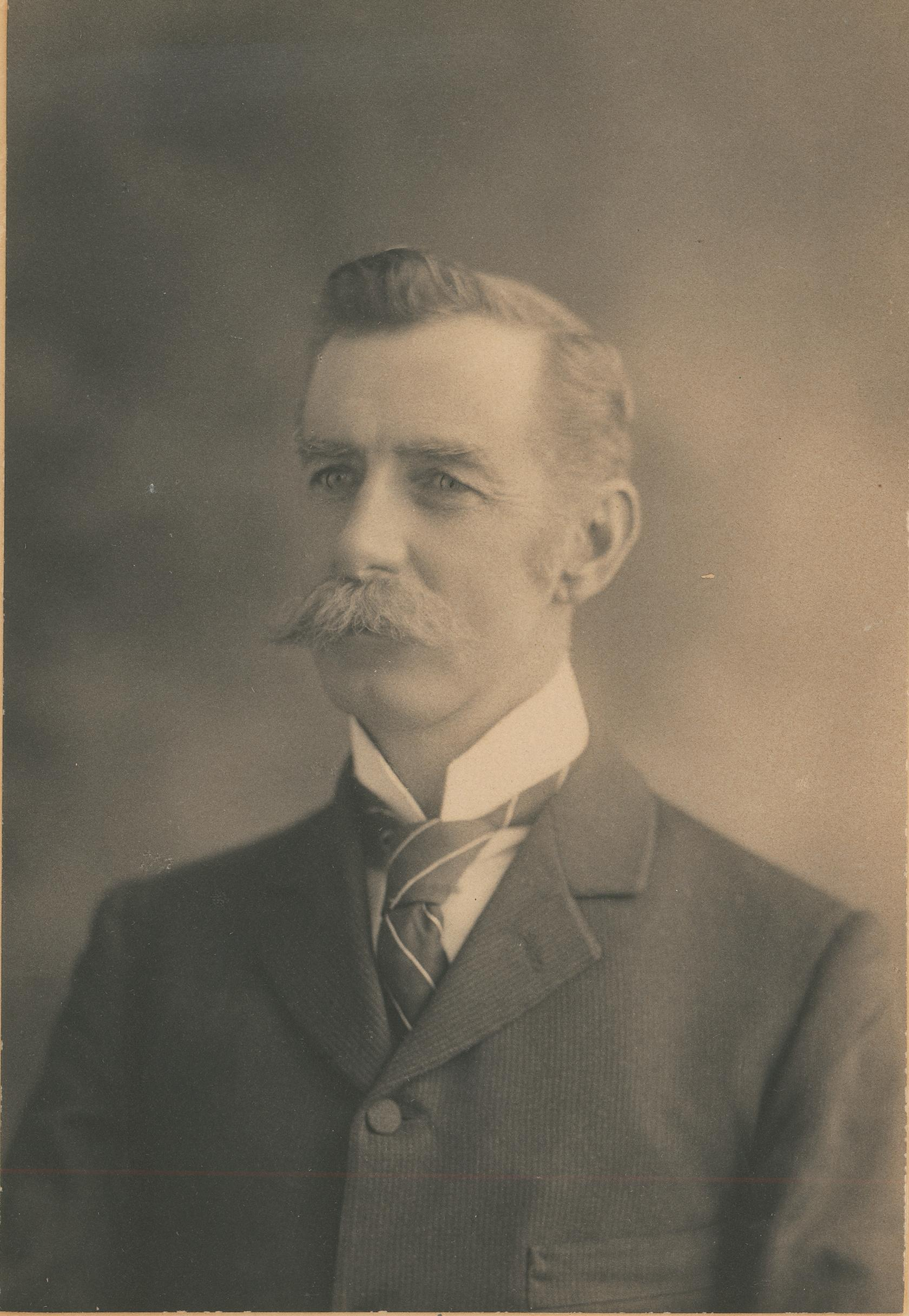
Sir Richard Butler

- 24 January – William Aitcheson Haswell, zoologist (born in the United Kingdom) (b. 1854)
- 4 February – Richard Godfrey Rivers, artist (born and died in the United Kingdom) (b. 1859)
- 23 February – John Holman, Western Australian politician (b. 1872)
- 1 March – John Ferguson, minister (born in the United Kingdom) (b. 1852)
- 16 April – Thomas McCawley, 5th Chief Justice of Queensland (b. 1881)
- 20 April – Rose Scott, suffragette (b. 1847)
- 28 April – Sir Richard Butler, 23rd Premier of South Australia (born and died in the United Kingdom) (b. 1850)
- 22 June – Matthew Gibney, bishop (born in Ireland) (b. 1835)
- 27 June – Simpson Newland, South Australian politician, pastoralist and author (born in the United Kingdom) (b. 1835)
- 18 July – Edward Russell, Victorian politician (b. 1878)
- 26 July – William Trenwith, 1st Leader of the Victorian Labor Party (b. 1846)
- 30 August – Magnus Cromarty, New South Wales politician (b. 1875)
- 5 September – Reginald Augustus Frederick Murray, geologist and surveyor (born in the United Kingdom) (b. 1846)
- 6 or 8 September– Louisa Briggs, Aboriginal Australian rights activist, dormitory matron, midwife and nurse recognized as five apical ancestors from whom Boonwurrung descent is established (b. 1818 or 1836)
- 28 September – Joseph Brown, Victorian politician (born in the United Kingdom) (b. 1844)
- 3 October – Charles Web Gilbert, sculptor (b. 1867)
- 24 October – Charles Kenningham, opera singer and actor (born in the United Kingdom) (b. 1860)
- 4 November – Paddy Hannan, prospector (born in Ireland) (b. 1840)
- 13 November – Charles McDonald, Queensland politician (b. 1860)
- 16 November – Joseph Maiden, botanist (born in the United Kingdom) (b. 1859)

== See also ==
- List of Australian films of the 1920s
