= 1926 in Australia =

- Decades: 1900s; 1910s; 1920s; 1930s; 1940s
- See also: 1926 in Australian literature; Other events of 1926; Timeline of Australian history

The following lists events that happened during 1926 in Australia.

1926 in Australia
- Monarch: George V
- Governor-General: John Baird
- Prime minister: Stanley Bruce
- Population: 6,056,360
- Elections: Queensland

== Incumbents ==
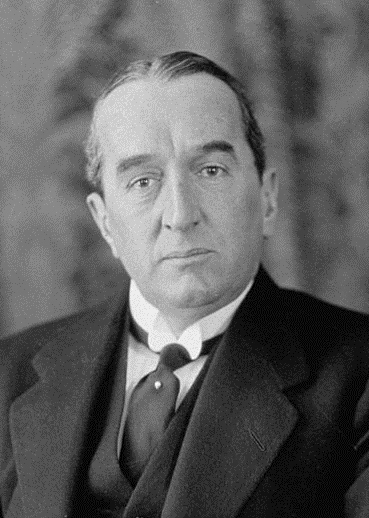
Stanley Bruce

- Monarch – George V
- Governor-General – Henry Forster, 1st Baron Forster of Lepe (until 8 October) then John Baird, 1st Viscount Stonehaven
- Prime Minister – Stanley Bruce
- Chief Justice – Adrian Knox

=== State premiers ===
- Premier of New South Wales – Jack Lang
- Premier of Queensland – William McCormack
- Premier of South Australia – John Gunn (until 28 August), then Lionel Hill
- Premier of Tasmania – Joseph Lyons
- Premier of Victoria – John Allan
- Premier of Western Australia – Philip Collier

=== State governors ===
- Governor of New South Wales – Sir Dudley de Chair
- Governor of Queensland – none appointed
- Governor of South Australia – Sir Tom Bridges
- Governor of Tasmania – Sir James O'Grady
- Governor of Victoria – George Rous, 3rd Earl of Stradbroke (until 7 April), then Arthur Somers-Cocks, 6th Baron Somers (from 28 June)
- Governor of Western Australia – Sir William Campion

== Events ==
- 19 April – The High Court of Australia finds in the case of Clyde Engineering Co Ltd v Cowburn that the Forty-Four Hours Week Act 1925 (NSW) was incompatible with Commonwealth legislation.
- 3 September – The Canberra Times is first published.
- 4 September – A federal referendum is held, containing two questions: Industry and Commerce and Essential Services. Neither question is passed.
- 13 September – Twenty-six people are killed in the Murulla railway accident.
- Helen Wayth wins the first Miss Australia Quest
- Ballerina Anna Pavlova tours Australia

== Science and technology ==
- 22 June – The Council for Scientific and Industrial Research (CSIR) is founded, the precursor to today's CSIRO (Commonwealth Scientific and Industrial Research Organisation).

== Arts and literature ==
- William McInnes wins the Archibald Prize

== Sport ==
- 18 September – South Sydney Rabbitohs defeat University 11–5, becoming premiers of the New South Wales Rugby Football League season 1926.
- 25 September – Melbourne defeat Collingwood 17.17 (119) to 9.8 (62) at the VFL grand final, becoming premiers of the 1926 VFL season.
- 2 November – Spearfelt wins the Melbourne Cup.
- New South Wales wins the Sheffield Shield

== Births ==
- 7 January – Joe Marston, soccer player (died 2015)
- 11 January – Baillieu Myer, businessman and philanthropist (died 2022)
- 3 February – Raymond Martin, chemist (died 2020)
- 4 February – Dave Sands, boxer (died 1952)
- 6 February – Bruce Ruxton, former soldier and president of the RSL (died 2011)
- 8 February – Tony Street, politician (died 2022)
- 10 February – Arvi Parbo, businessman (died 2019)
- 16 February – Rayene Stewart Simpson, soldier and Victoria Cross recipient (died 1978)
- 6 March – Ray O'Connor, Premier of Western Australia (1982–1983) (died 2013)
- 15 March – Thelma Keane, wife of cartoonist Bil Keane and inspiration for the "Mommy" character in The Family Circus (died 2008)
- 2 April – Jack Brabham, racing driver (died 2014)
- 13 April – Neil Betts, rugby union player (died 2017)
- 11 May – Frank Thring, actor (died 1994)
- 9 June – Don Ritchie, anti-suicide campaigner (died 2012)
- 18 June – Shirley McKechnie, dancer, choreographer and dance educator (died 2022)
- 25 June – Kep Enderby, Esperantist and politician (died 2015)
- 27 June – Bruce Tozer, cricketer (died 2021)
- 1 July – Stan Obst, Australian rules footballer (died 2005)
- 3 July – Laurence Street, jurist and former Chief Justice of the Supreme Court of New South Wales (died 2018)
- 4 July – Stuart Thomas Butler, nuclear physicist (died 1982)
- 9 July – Peter Mullins, decathlete (died 2012)
- 12 July – Al Grassby, politician, Minister for Immigration (died 2005)
- 20 July – Russ Gorman, politician (died 2017)
- 31 July – Jack Pollard, sports writer and cricket historian (died 2002)
- 5 August – Doug McClelland, politician
- 15 August – Ted Allsopp, race walker (died 2024)
- 27 August – Reg Watson, television producer and screenwriter (died 2019)
- 8 September – Keith Adams, adventurer (died 2012)
- 16 September – Sir William Cole, public servant (died 2019)
- 18 September – Deirdre Jordan, academic and educator (died 2026)
- 30 September – Frank O'Neill, swimmer (died 2024)
- 11 October – Neville Wran, Premier of New South Wales (1976–1986) (died 2014)
- 20 October – Peter Durack, politician, Attorney-General (died 2008)
- 7 November – Joan Sutherland, opera singer (died 2010)
- 15 November – Ivor Greenwood, politician, Attorney-General (died 1976)
- 31 December – Sir Billy Snedden, politician, Leader of the Liberal Party (died 1987)

== Deaths ==
- 9 January – William Henry Warren, engineer (born in the United Kingdom) (b. 1852)
- 12 January – Sir Austin Chapman, New South Wales politician (b. 1864)
- 30 April – Sir Tim Coghlan, New South Wales statistician, engineer and diplomat (died in the United Kingdom) (b. 1856)
- 11 May – Sir Hugh Dixson, businessman and philanthropist (died in British Ceylon) (b. 1841)
- 15 May – Joseph James Fletcher, biologist (born in New Zealand) (b. 1850)
- 16 May – Joe Slater, composer and music publisher (b. 1872)
- 21 May – Hugh Victor McKay, industrialist (b. 1865)
- 4 June – Fred Spofforth, cricketer (died in the United Kingdom) (b. 1853)
- 23 June – Lowther Clarke, Anglican archbishop (born and died in the United Kingdom) (b. 1850)
- 28 June – William Archibald, South Australian politician (born in the United Kingdom) (b. 1850)
- 14 July – Sir Charles Mackellar, New South Wales politician and surgeon (b. 1844)
- 19 July – Ada Cambridge, author (born in the United Kingdom) (b. 1844)
- 14 September – Charles Hedley, naturalist (born in the United Kingdom) (b. 1862)
- 3 October – Samuel James Mitchell, 1st Chief Justice of the Northern Territory (b. 1852)
- 11 December
  - Sir William McMillan, New South Wales politician and businessman (born in Ireland) (b. 1850)
  - Gottlieb Schuler, journalist (born in Germany) (b. 1853)
- 13 December – William Spence, trade union leader and politician (born in the United Kingdom) (b. 1846)

== See also ==
- List of Australian films of the 1920s
