= 1921 in Australia =

- Decades: 1900s; 1910s; 1920s; 1930s; 1940s
- See also: 1921 in Australian literature; Other events of 1921; Timeline of Australian history

The following lists events that happened during 1921 in Australia.

1921 in Australia
- Monarch: George V
- Governor-General: Henry Forster
- Prime minister: Billy Hughes
- Population: 5,455,136
- Elections: Western Australia, Victoria, South Australia

== Incumbents ==
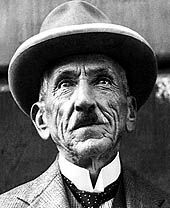
Billy Hughes

- Monarch – George V
- Governor-General – Henry Forster
- Prime Minister – Billy Hughes
- Chief Justice – Adrian Knox

=== State premiers ===
- Premier of New South Wales – John Storey (until 5 October), then James Dooley (from 10 October until 20 December), then George Fuller (for 7 hours on 20 December), then James Dooley
- Premier of Queensland – Ted Theodore
- Premier of South Australia – Henry Barwell
- Premier of Tasmania – Walter Lee
- Premier of Victoria – Harry Lawson
- Premier of Western Australia – James Mitchell

=== State governors ===
- Governor of New South Wales – Sir Walter Davidson
- Governor of Queensland – Sir Matthew Nathan
- Governor of South Australia – Sir William Weigall
- Governor of Tasmania – Sir William Allardyce
- Governor of Victoria – George Rous, 3rd Earl of Stradbroke (from 21 February)
- Governor of Western Australia – Sir Francis Newdegate

== Events ==
- March – Group Settlement Scheme begins at Manjimup, Western Australia.
- 7 March – The Commonwealth Department of Health is formed.
- 12 March – Edith Cowan becomes the first female parliamentarian in Australia, when she is elected to the Western Australian Legislative Council.
- 22 March – New South Wales MP Percy Brookfield is shot and killed when he tackles a crazed gunman at the train station in Riverton, South Australia.
- 31 March – The Royal Australian Air Force is established.
- 9 May – Australia assumes responsibility for administration of the Territory of New Guinea, following a League of Nations mandate divesting Germany of its colonies as required by the Treaty of Versailles.
- 30 August – A general election is held in Victoria. Harry Lawson of the Nationalist Party is returned as premier, although in a minority government.
- 26 October – The first group of Barnardo's Boys arrived in Sydney.
- 3 November – Federal MP Walter Marks told the House of Representatives that Armageddon would occur in 1934.
- 13 November – The cartoon character Ginger Meggs makes his first appearance, in a Sunday Sun comic strip "Us Fellers" drawn by cartoonist Jimmy Bancks.
- 30 December – Twelve-year-old Alma Tirtschke is raped and murdered in Melbourne, in what becomes known as the Gun Alley Murder.
- 31 December – Walter Burley Griffin is removed as director of construction for Canberra after disagreements over his supervisory role.

== Arts and literature ==
Roguish Eyes Mazurka (1920)
MIDI rendition

- William McInnes wins the inaugural Archibald Prize for portraiture
- Droving into the light – Hans Heysen
- Weighing the fleece – George W Lambert
- The White Glove – George W Lambert

== Film ==
The first silent film

== Sport ==
- Sister Olive wins the Melbourne Cup
- New South Wales wins the Sheffield Shield
- In Test Cricket, Australia defeated England in The Ashes series
- A Le Fevre wins the Australian Open Championship in golf
- The 1921 VFL seasonThe Premiership is won by Richmond 5.6.36 to Carlton 4.8.32. Attendance 43,122 at the MCG.
- The 1921 NSWRFL season sees the introduction of the St. George club, replacing Annandale, who departed the league after the 1920 season. The Premiership is won by North Sydney.

== Births ==
- 3 January
  - Bob Dawson, Australian rules footballer (died 2023)
  - Vasey Houghton, politician and conservationist (died 2001)
- 9 January – Bunney Brooke, actor (Number 96) (died 2000)
- 3 February – John Millett, poet (died 2019)
- 16 February – Bill Knott, NSW politician (died 2013)
- 21 February – Rupert Myers, metallurgist (died 2019)
- 4 March – Walter Campbell, Governor of Queensland (died 2004)
- 12 March – Norm Foster, politician (died 2006)
- 28 April – Robert Furlonger, diplomat and public servant (died 2019)
- 29 March – Sam Loxton, cricketer (died 2011)
- 1 April – Harold James Frith, ornithologist (died 1982)
- 13 April – Max Harris, writer (Angry Penguins) (died 1995)
- 16 April – Guy Warren, painter (died 2024)
- 13 May – George Petersen, Labor politician (died 2000)
- 23 May – Ray Lawler, playwright (died 2024)
- 26 May – Norman Hetherington, artist, puppeteer (died 2010)
- 28 May – Tom Uren, Labor politician (died 2015)
- 3 June – Forbes Carlile, swimming coach and Olympic pentathlete (died 2016)
- 7 June – Myrtle Edwards, cricketer and softball player (died 2010)
- 19 June – Patricia Wrightson, children's author (died 2010)
- 1 July – Teddy Long, Australian rules footballer (died 2008)
- 15 July – Barrie Dexter, senior diplomat (died 2018)
- 21 July – Mary MacLean Hindmarsh, botanist (died 2000)
- 22 July – Ronald N. Bracewell, physicist and radio astronomer (died 2007)
- 31 July – John Makepeace Bennett, computer scientist (died 2010)
- 9 August – Catherine Pym, fencer (died 2018)
- 20 August – Jack Wilson, cricketer (died 1985)
- 21 November – Betty Wilson, cricketer (died 2010)
- 24 November – Allan Ashbolt, journalist (died 2005)
- 26 December – Donald Horne, journalist and writer (died 2005)

== Deaths ==
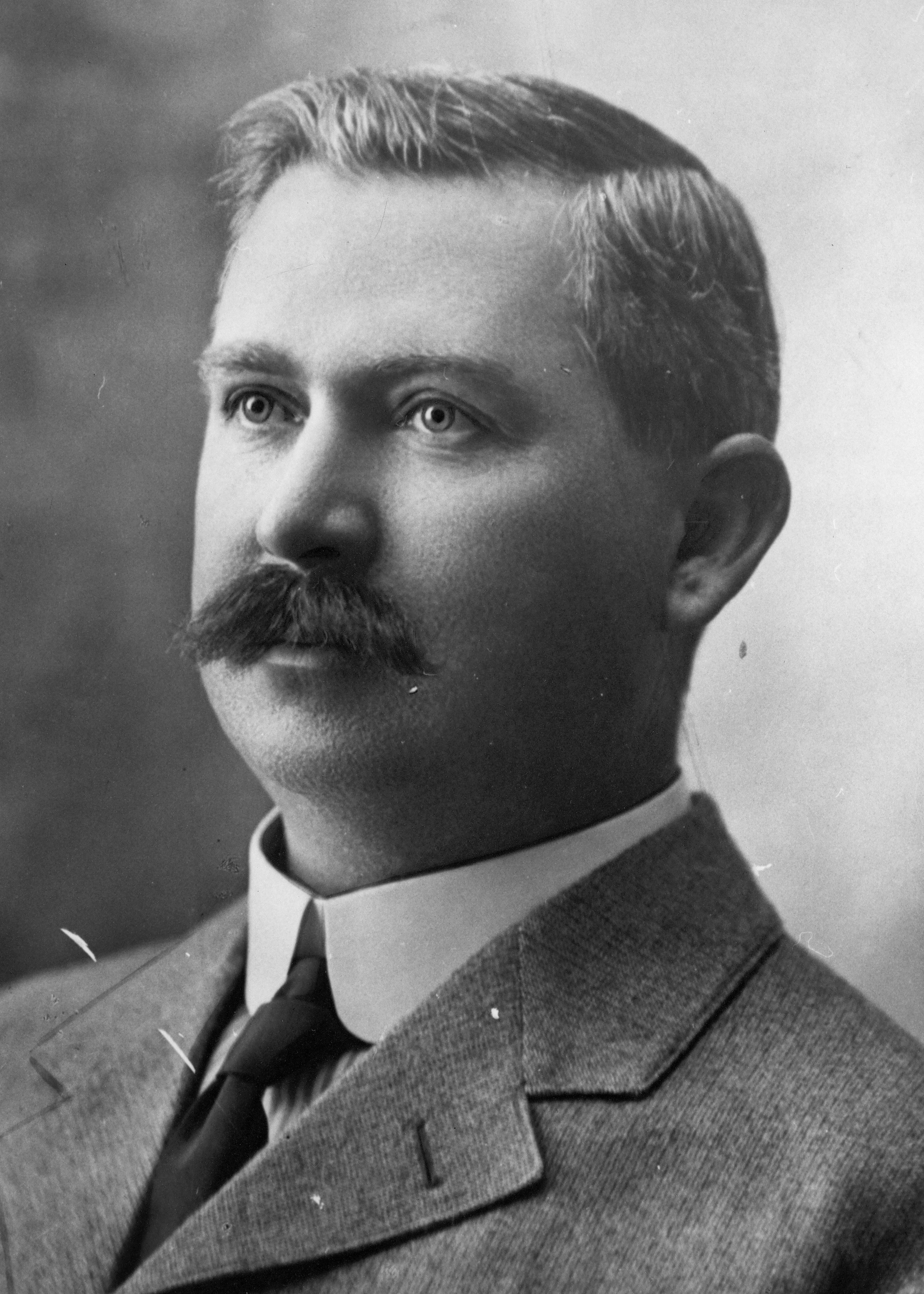
T. J. Ryan

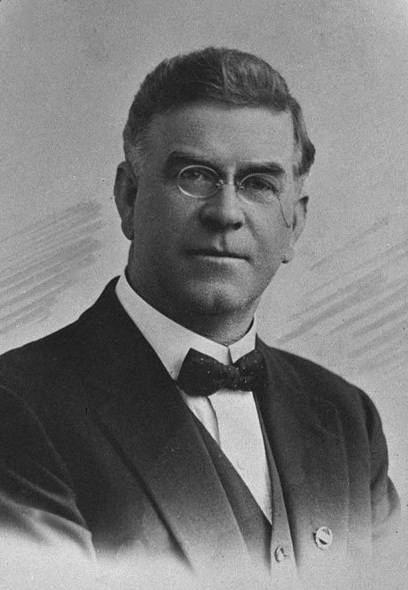
John Storey

- 14 January – Edward Hamersley, Western Australian politician and pastoralist (born in France) (b. 1835)
- 27 January – Maurice Buckley, soldier (b. 1891)
- 26 February – William Emmett Murphy, trade unionist (born in Ireland) (b. 1841)
- 14 March – Gustave Barnes, artist (born in the United Kingdom) (b. 1877)
- 21 May – Oswald Watt, aviator and businessman (born in the United Kingdom) (b. 1878)
- 3 June – Jim Page, Queensland politician (born in the United Kingdom) (b. 1861)
- 6 June – William Mark Forster, philanthropist (born in the United Kingdom) (b. 1846)
- 18 June – G. H. Gibson, writer and satirist (born in the United Kingdom) (b. 1846)
- 2 July – Edwin Evans, cricketer (b. 1849)
- 12 July – Harry Hawker, aviation pioneer (died in the United Kingdom) (b. 1889)
- 26 July – Howard Vernon, actor (b. 1845)
- 1 August – T. J. Ryan, 19th Premier of Queensland (b. 1876)
- 7 August – Rose Ann Creal, military nurse, recipient of Royal Red Cross medal (b. 1865)
- 23 August – Frank Hann, pastoralist and explorer (born in the United Kingdom) (b. 1845)
- 13 September – James Hebblethwaite, poet (born in the United Kingdom) (b. 1857)
- 5 October – John Storey, 20th Premier of New South Wales (b. 1869)
- 30 October – James Murdoch, Orientalist scholar and journalist (born in the United Kingdom) (b. 1856)
- 6 November – Robert Logan Jack, geologist (born in the United Kingdom) (b. 1845)
- 17 November – John McLaren, cricketer (b. 1886)
- 27 November - Mary Grant Roberts, zoo owner (b. 1841)
- 24 December – William Curran, cricketer (b. 1862)

== See also ==
- List of Australian films of the 1920s
