= 1928 in Australia =

- Decades: 1900s; 1910s; 1920s; 1930s; 1940s
- See also: 1928 in Australian literature; Other events of 1928; Federal election; Timeline of Australian history

The following lists events that happened during 1928 in Australia.

1928 in Australia
- Monarch: George V
- Governor-General: John Baird
- Prime minister: Stanley Bruce
- Population: 6,302,210
- Elections: Federal, Tasmania

== Incumbents ==
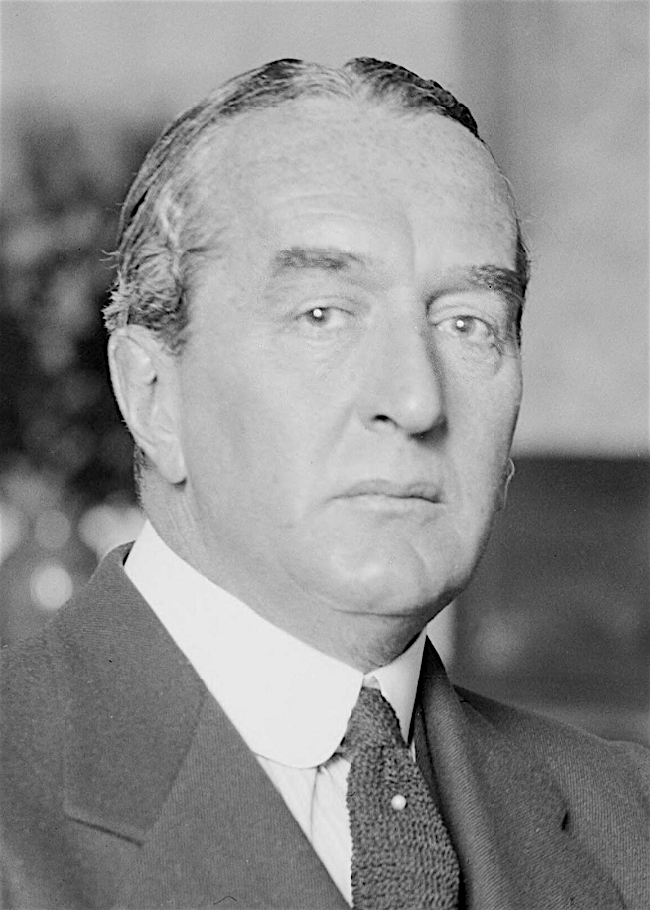
Stanley Bruce

- Monarch – George V
- Governor-General – John Baird, 1st Viscount Stonehaven
- Prime Minister – Stanley Bruce
- Chief Justice – Adrian Knox

=== State premiers ===
- Premier of New South Wales – Thomas Bavin
- Premier of Queensland – William McCormack
- Premier of South Australia – Richard Layton Butler
- Premier of Tasmania – Joseph Lyons (until 15 June), then John McPhee
- Premier of Victoria – Edmond Hogan (until 22 November), then William McPherson
- Premier of Western Australia – Philip Collier

=== State governors ===
- Governor of New South Wales – Sir Dudley de Chair
- Governor of Queensland – Sir John Goodwin
- Governor of South Australia – Sir Alexander Hore-Ruthven (from 14 May)
- Governor of Tasmania – Sir James O'Grady
- Governor of Victoria – Arthur Somers-Cocks, 6th Baron Somers
- Governor of Western Australia – Sir William Campion

== Events ==
- 27–28 January – Bundaberg tragedy: 12 children die in Bundaberg, Queensland, after being inoculated with a diphtheria vaccine contaminated with the Staphylococcus aureus bacterium.
- 22 February – Bert Hinkler arrives in Darwin, Northern Territory after flying solo from London on 7 February, and then, later, he arrives in his hometown of Bundaberg on 27 February.
- 17 May – The Royal Flying Doctor Service makes its first official flight from Cloncurry to Julia Creek
- 8 June – Charles Kingsford Smith and his crew arrive in Brisbane, after completing the first flight across the Pacific Ocean in the "Southern Cross" after leaving the United States on 31 May.
- 14 August – The Coniston massacre begins.
- 20 December – Hubert Wilkins makes the first flight over Antarctica in his Lockheed Vega San Francisco
- The first Speedos are produced

== Arts and literature ==
- John Longstaff wins the Archibald Prize with his portrait of Dr Alexander Leeper
- Arthur Streeton wins the Wynne Prize with his landscape Afternoon Light, Goulburn Valley

== Film ==
- 29 December – The Jazz Singer becomes the first sound film screened in Australia. It premieres at the Lyceum Theatre in Sydney

== Sport ==
- 15 September - The 1928 NSWRFL season culminates in South Sydney's 26–5 victory over Eastern Suburbs in the final.
- 6 November – Statesman wins the Melbourne Cup.
- Victoria wins the Sheffield Shield
- Bobby Pearce wins Australia's only gold medal at the 1928 Summer Olympics. He won the men's 200m sculls
- The first Australian Grand Prix is held at Phillip Island

== Births ==
- 17 January – Ken Archer, cricketer (died 2023)
- 19 January – John Treloar, track and field athlete (died 2012)
- 21 January – James Achurch, javelin thrower (died 2015)
- 29 February – Terry Lewis, police officer and convicted fraudster (died 2023)
- 14 March – June Maston, sprinter and athletics coach (died 2004)
- 2 April – Denis Flannery, rugby league footballer of the 1940s and 1950s (died 2012)
- 30 May – Pro Hart, artist (died 2006)
- June – Mike Williamson, sports commentator (died 2019)
- 3 June – Beryl Kimber, violinist and educator (died 2022)
- 12 June – Bob Davis, Australian rules footballer (died 2011)
- 15 June – Joan Croll, physician and radiologist (died 2022)
- 18 June – Michael Blakemore, actor and director (died 2023)
- 1 July – Robert Wemyss, Australian football (soccer) player
- 7 July – Henry Sommerville, fencer (died 2010)
- 17 July – David Leach, senior officer of the Royal Australian Navy (died 2020)
- 18 July – Russell Mockridge, cyclist (died 1958)
- 8 August – Don Burrows, jazz musician (died 2020)
- 12 August – Charles Blackman, painter (died 2018)
- 31 August – A. W. Pryor, physicist (died 2014)
- 8 October – Leonard French, glass artist (died 2017)
- 26 October – Shirley Abicair, actress, musician and author (died 2025 in UK)
- 27 October – Thomas Perrin, cricketer
- 16 November – Patricia Giles, activist (died 2017)
- 17 November – Colin McDonald, cricketer (died 2021)
- 18 November – Bruce Rosier, Anglican bishop (died 2019)
- 30 November – Steele Hall, Premier of South Australia (died 2024)
- 15 December – Peter Coleman, politician and writer (died 2019)
- 26 December – Maureen Brunt, economist (died 2019)
- 27 December – Phillip Bennett, Governor of Tasmania (died 2023)
- date unknown – John Challis, gay rights activist

== Deaths ==
- 9 February – William Gillies, 21st Premier of Queensland (b. 1868)
- 1 April – Andrew Lang Petrie, Queensland politician (b. 1854)
- 19 May – John Barrett, Victorian politician (b. 1858)
- 19 July – Norman Ewing, Tasmanian Opposition Leader (b. 1870)
- 22 October – Andrew Fisher, 5th Prime Minister of Australia (born and died in the United Kingdom) (b. 1862)
- Unknown, possibly August – Bert Rache, composer (b. unknown)

== See also ==
- List of Australian films of the 1920s
