= 1922 in Australia =

- Decades: 1900s; 1910s; 1920s; 1930s; 1940s
- See also: 1922 in Australian literature; Other events of 1922; Federal election; Timeline of Australian history

The following lists events that happened during 1922 in Australia.

1922 in Australia
- Monarch: George V
- Governor-General: Henry Forster
- Prime minister: Billy Hughes
- Population: 5,569,889
- Elections: Federal, New South Wales, Tasmania

== Incumbents ==
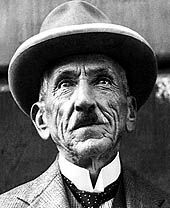
Billy Hughes

- Monarch – George V
- Governor-General – Henry Forster, 1st Baron Forster of Lepe
- Prime Minister – Billy Hughes
- Chief Justice – Adrian Knox

=== State premiers ===
- Premier of New South Wales – James Dooley (until 13 April), then George Fuller
- Premier of Queensland – Ted Theodore
- Premier of South Australia – Henry Barwell
- Premier of Tasmania – Walter Lee (until 12 August), then John Hayes
- Premier of Western Australia – James Mitchell
- Premier of Victoria – Harry Lawson

=== State governors ===
- Governor of New South Wales – Sir Walter Davidson
- Governor of Queensland – Sir Matthew Nathan
- Governor of South Australia – Sir William Weigall (until 24 April), then Sir Tom Bridges (from 4 December)
- Governor of Tasmania – Sir William Allardyce
- Governor of Victoria – George Rous, 3rd Earl of Stradbroke
- Governor of Western Australia – Sir Francis Newdegate

== Events ==
- 14 February – Women are allowed to stand for parliament in Tasmania.
- 22 March – The Queensland Legislative Council, the upper house of the Parliament of Queensland is abolished.
- 10 June – A general election is held in Tasmania, which results in a hung parliament.
- 3 July – Queensland abolishes capital punishment, the first state in Australia to do so. The Legislative Assembly of Queensland voted 33 to 30 to abolish the death penalty.
- 12 August – The Country Party and the Nationalist Party form a coalition government in Tasmania, with John Hayes as Premier.

== Science and technology ==
- 21 September – A total solar eclipse occurs over Australia, allowing scientists to test Albert Einstein's general theory of relativity.

== Arts and literature ==
- 4 May – British author D. H. Lawrence arrives in Australia for a three-month holiday, where he will meet Mollie Skinner and write the novel Kangaroo.

== Sport ==
- 28 February – Victoria wins the Sheffield Shield.
- 30 September – Fitzroy wins the 1922 VFL Grand Final, defeating Collingwood 11.13 (79) to 9.14 (68).
- 7 November – King Ingoda wins the Melbourne Cup.
- The 1922 NSWRFL Premiership is won by North Sydney, who defeated Glebe 35–3 in the final.

== Births ==
- 5 January – Anthony Synnot, Chief of the Defence Force (died 2001)
- 15 January – Eric Willis, Premier of New South Wales (died 1999)
- 23 January – Tom Lewis, Premier of New South Wales (died 2016)
- 21 February – Fos Williams, Australian rules footballer (died 2001)
- 24 February – Bill Morris, Australian rules footballer (died 1960)
- 14 March – Bob Bignall, soccer player (died 2013)
- 15 March – Hesba Fay Brinsmead, children's author (died 2003)
- 28 March – Neville Bonner, first Indigenous federal MP (died 1999)
- 29 March – Mac Holten, Australian rules footballer and politician (died 1996)
- 30 March – John McLeay, Jr., politician (died 2000)
- 10 April – Nancy Millis, microbiologist (died 2012)
- 9 May – Col Hoy, cricket umpire (died 1999)
- 12 May – Arthur Gorrie, Hobby shop proprietor (died 1992)
- 27 June – Milton Clark, Australian rules footballer (died 2018)
- 7 July – Robert Raymond, filmmaker and television pioneer (died 2003)
- 29 July – Mac Wilson, Australian rules footballer (died 1996)
- 1 August – Pat McDonald, actress (Number 96) (died 1990)
- 23 August – Ronald Wilson, High Court justice (died 2005)
- 30 August – Lionel Murphy, Attorney-General and High Court justice (died 1986)
- 25 September – Ted Baldwin, politician (died 2008)
- 26 September – Leonard Teale, actor (died 1994)
- 7 October – Jim McCabe, Victorian politician (died 2019)
- 10 October – Tim McNamara, musician (died 1983)
- 1 November – James Rowland, Chief of Air Force and Governor of New South Wales (died 1999)
- 18 November – Una Hale, operatic soprano (died 2005)
- 4 December – Densey Clyne, naturalist, photographer and writer (died 2019)
- 6 December – Gordon Ada, microbiologist (died 2012)
- 20 December – Geoff Mack, country music singer (died 2017)
- 28 December – Lionel Bowen, politician (died 2012)

== Deaths ==
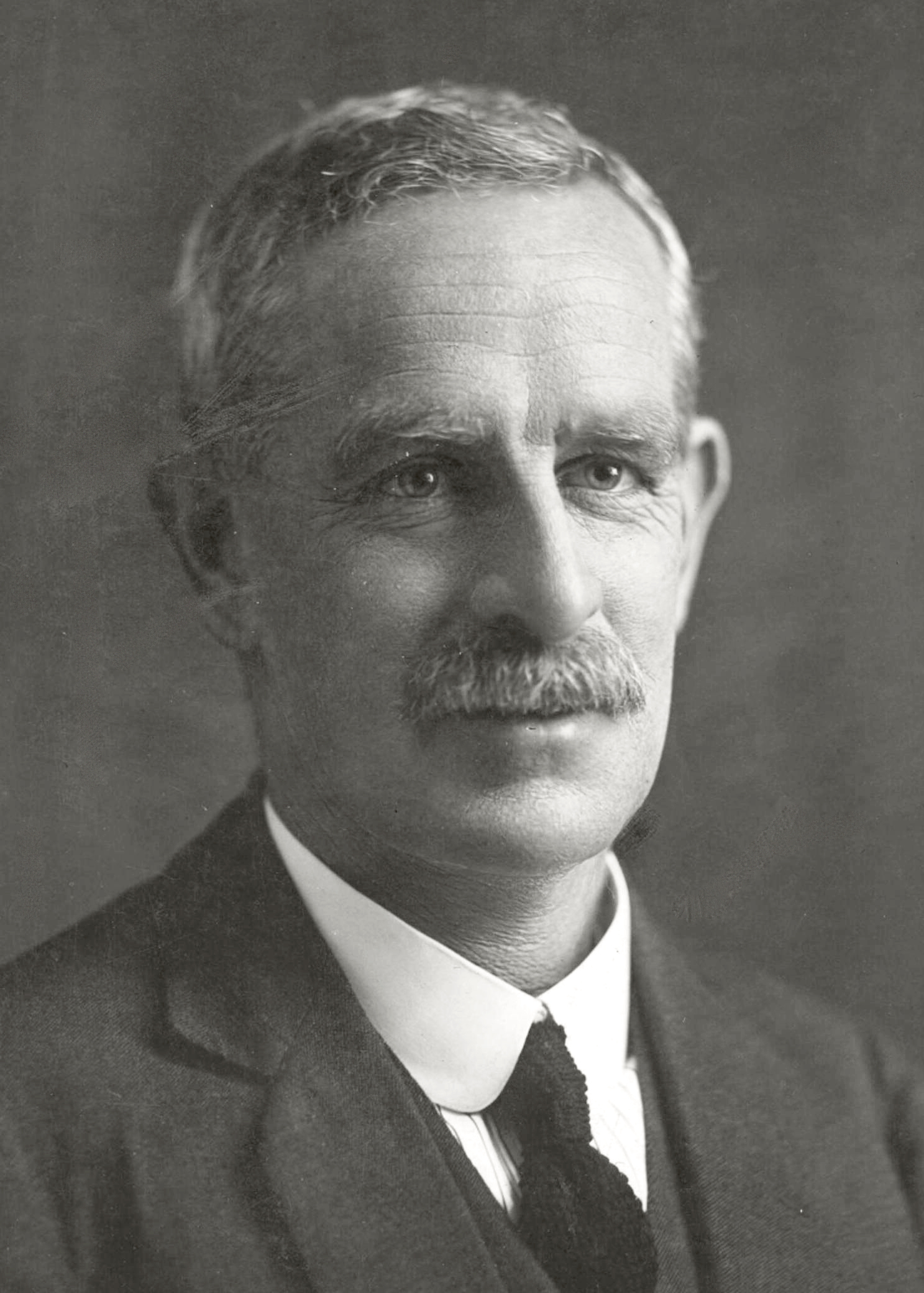
Frank Tudor

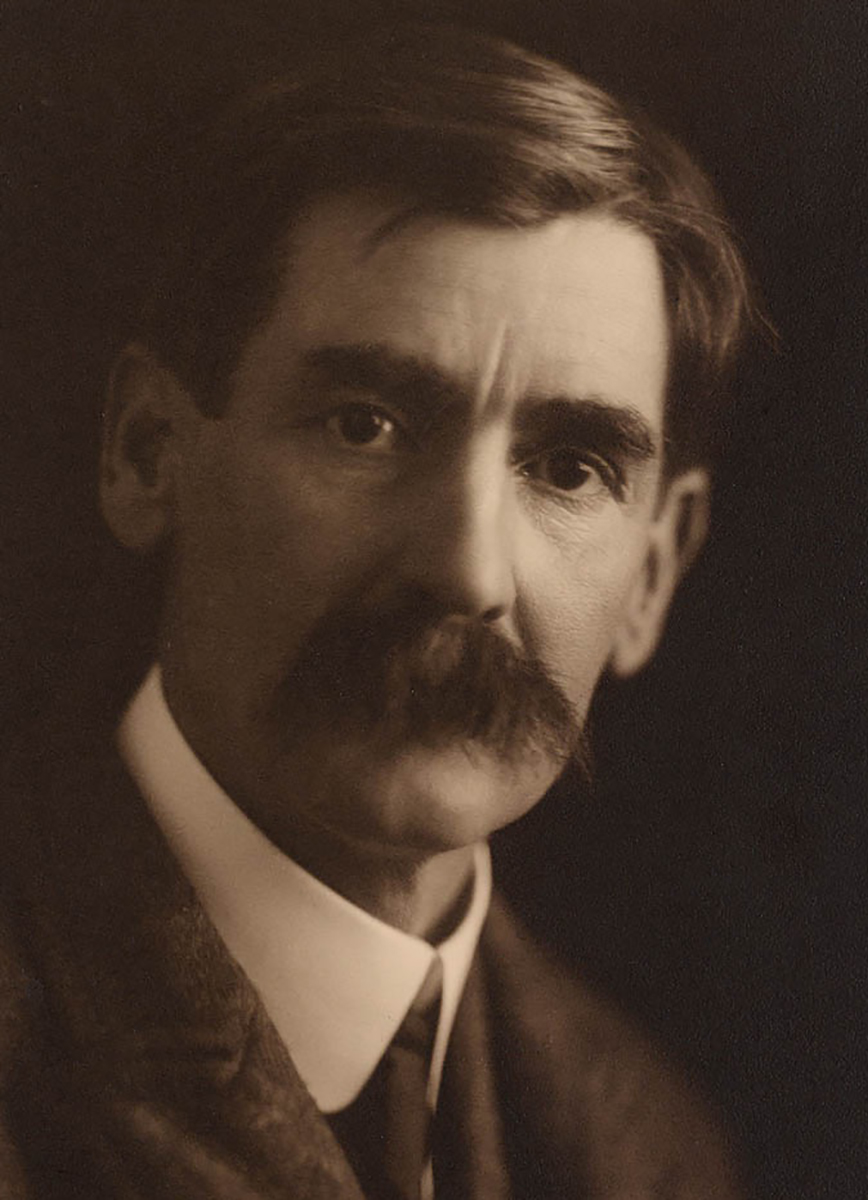
Henry Lawson

- 10 January – Frank Tudor, 6th Federal Leader of the Opposition (b. 1866)
- 14 February – Bertram Stevens, art and literary critic (b. 1872)
- 8 March – Elizabeth, Lady Hope, evangelist (b. 1842)
- 22 March – Arthur Groom, Victorian politician and land agent (b. 1852)
- 4 April – Peter Waite, pastoralist, businessman and philanthropist (born in the United Kingdom) (b. 1834)
- 7 April – James McGowen, 18th Premier of New South Wales (born in the Indian Ocean) (b. 1855)
- 14 April – Rose Summerfield, feminist and labour activist (died in Paraguay) (b. 1864)
- 24 April – Colin Campbell Ross, wine bar owner and falsely convicted murderer (b. 1892)
- 30 April – Robert Carl Sticht, metallurgist and art collector (born in the United States) (b. 1856)
- 24 May – James Arthur Pollock, physicist (born in Ireland) (b. 1865)
- 25 May – Roy Redgrave, actor (born in the United Kingdom) (b. 1873)
- 31 May – Jørgen Jensen, soldier (born in Denmark) (b. 1891)
- 15 June – Alfred Cecil Rowlandson, publisher and bookseller (died in New Zealand) (b. 1865)
- 17 June – Sir Robert Philp, 15th Premier of Queensland (born in the United Kingdom) (d. 1922)
- 11 July – Hans Irvine, Victorian politician and winemaker (died in the United Kingdom) (b. 1856)
- 23 July – Joseph Edmund Carne, geologist (b. 1855)
- 2 September – Henry Lawson, writer and poet (b. 1867)
- 17 September – Kate Rickards, trapeze artist and musical theatre actress (died in the Red Sea) (b. 1862)
- 26 September – Sir Charles Wade, 17th Premier of New South Wales (b. 1863)
- 4 October – Ellis Rowan, naturalist and illustrator (b. 1848)
- 27 November – Dugald Thomson, New South Wales politician (born in the United Kingdom) (b. 1849)
- 17 December – David Lindsay, explorer and surveyor (b. 1856)

== See also ==
- List of Australian films of the 1920s
