= Victory Memorial Gardens =

Reserve in New South Wales, Australia

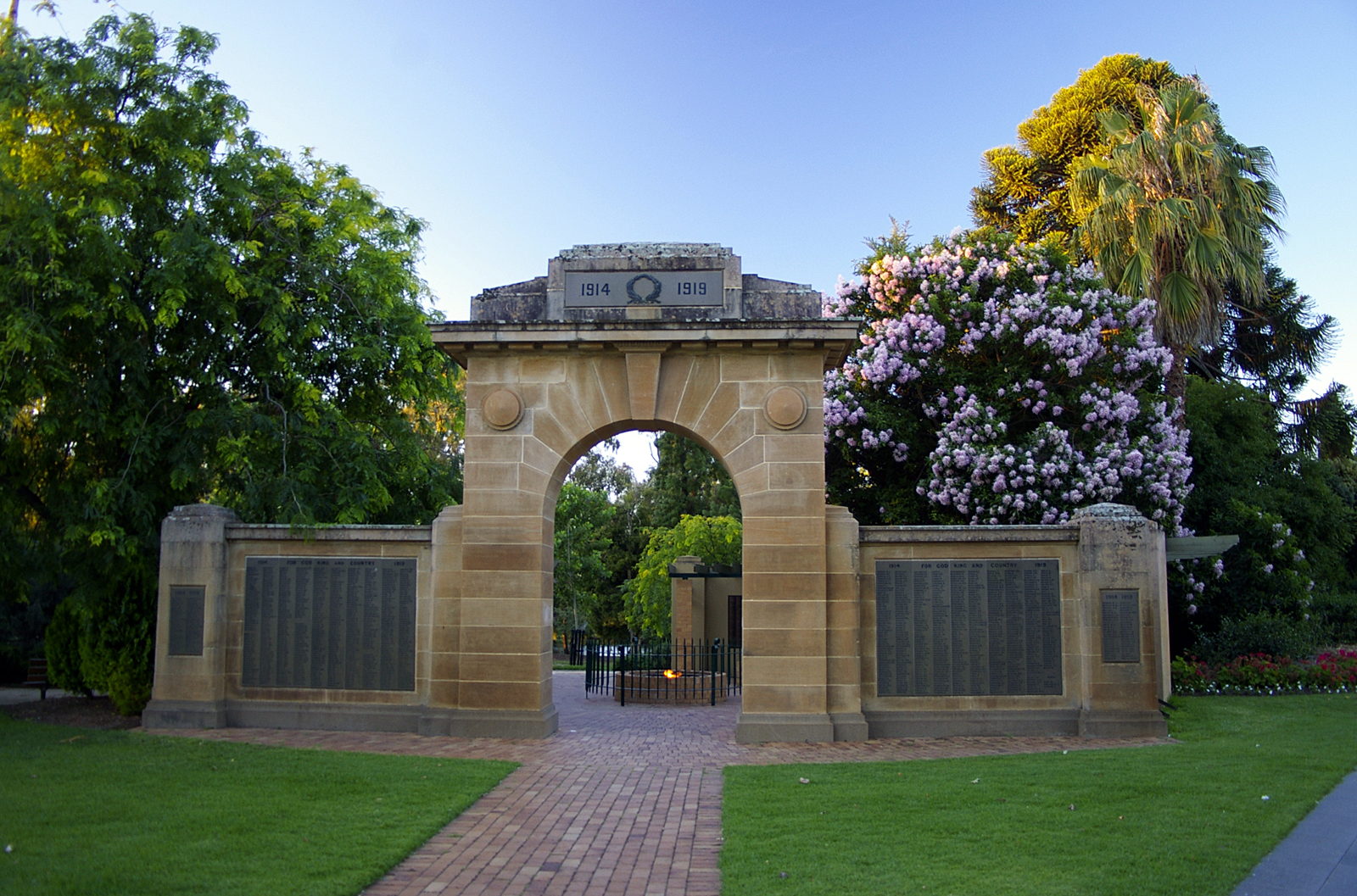
- Memorial Arch located in the Victory Memorial Gardens
- Interactive map of Victory Memorial Gardens
- Location: Wagga Wagga, New South Wales
- Coordinates: 35°6′33.12″S 147°22′10.56″E
- Area: 2.02 hectares (5.0 acres)
- Opened: 1925
- Owner: Wagga Wagga City Council
- Gazetted: 13 February 1931

Victory Memorial Gardens are located on the banks of the Wollundry Lagoon in the central business district of Wagga Wagga New South Wales, Australia. The 2.02 hectares (5.0 acres) of land were formerly the site of the Old Police Barracks and Police Paddock, where all of the police horses were kept. It became land for public recreation in February 1931. In 1925 the Wagga Wagga Municipality Council planned a tribute to those who fought and died in the First World War. The Council and Returned Sailors, Soldiers Imperial League of Australia (RSSILA) originally planned a memorial hall to be added onto the council chambers but public preference was for gardens. There was a public competition for the design which was won by Thomas Kerr who was the chief landscape gardener of the Royal Botanic Gardens in Sydney. Work on the gardens started in 1928.

In the midst of the war, there had been a proposal for a Memorial Arch to honour volunteer soldiers from 1916. The proposal gained momentum when the servicemen returned after the War. A plan was finally planned to construct a monumental archway entrance to a memorial gardens in 1925. The Victory Memorial Gardens Arch was finally completed at a cost of £1700 and was officially unveiled amid great fanfare on Anzac Day 1927 by Major-General C. F. Cox.

A cenotaph had been built earlier in 1922.

In 2006, the Chisholm Fountain, previously located in the Civic Centre precinct, was restored and installed in the gardens in time for Anzac Day commemorations.
