= 1924 in Australia =

- Decades: 1900s; 1910s; 1920s; 1930s; 1940s
- See also: 1924 in Australian literature; Other events of 1924; Timeline of Australian history

The following lists events that happened during 1924 in Australia.

1924 in Australia
- Monarch: George V
- Governor-General: Henry Forster
- Prime minister: Stanley Bruce
- Population: 5,811,145
- Elections: Western Australia, South Australia, Victoria

== Incumbents ==
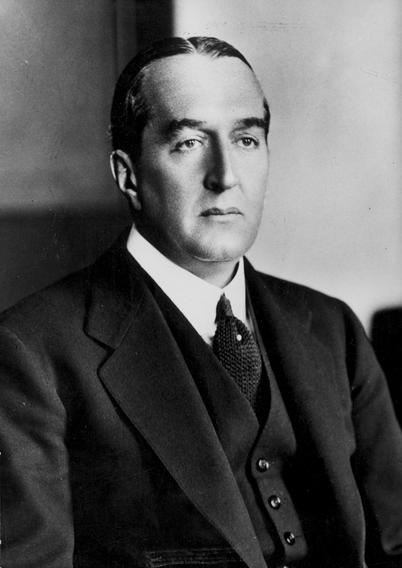
Stanley Bruce

- Monarch – George V
- Governor-General – Henry Forster, 1st Baron Forster
- Prime Minister – Stanley Bruce
- Chief Justice – Adrian Knox

=== State premiers ===
- Premier of New South Wales – Sir George Fuller
- Premier of Queensland – Ted Theodore
- Premier of South Australia – Henry Barwell (until 16 April), then John Gunn
- Premier of Tasmania – Joseph Lyons
- Premier of Victoria – Harry Lawson (until 28 April), then Sir Alexander Peacock (until 18 July), then George Prendergast (until 18 November), then John Allan
- Premier of Western Australia – James Mitchell (until 16 April), then Philip Collier

=== State governors ===
- Governor of New South Wales – Sir Dudley de Chair (from 28 February)
- Governor of Queensland – Sir Matthew Nathan
- Governor of South Australia – Sir Tom Bridges
- Governor of Tasmania – Sir James O'Grady (from 24 December)
- Governor of Victoria – George Rous, 3rd Earl of Stradbroke
- Governor of Western Australia – Sir Francis Newdegate (until 16 June), then Sir William Campion

== Events ==
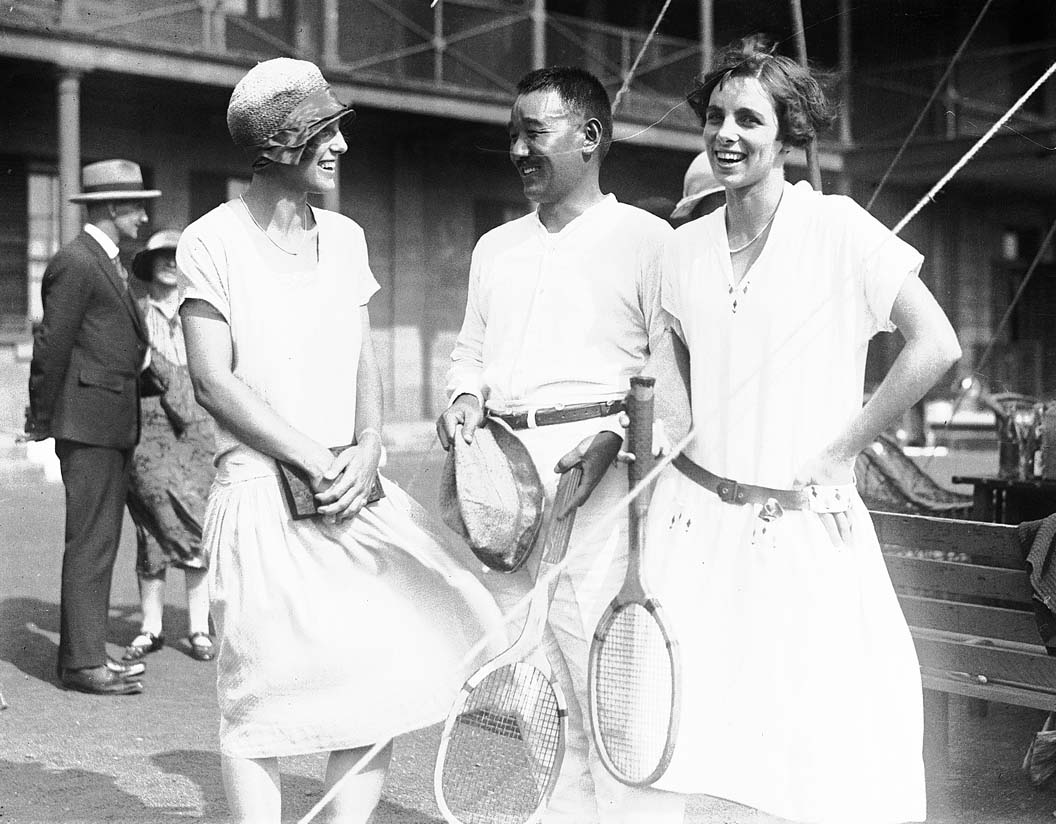
Entertaining visiting Japanese naval officers at a tennis party at Victoria Barracks, Sydney, 26 January 1924

- 1 January – The Australian Automobile Association was formed to lobby for federal road finance and a national traffic code.
- 26 January – 3AR, Victoria's first radio station, begins broadcasting.
- 30 January – The first Cabinet meeting was held in Canberra. The ministers met and also lodged at Yarralumla House, later the residence of the Governor-General.
- 1 February – The Australian Loan Council meets for the first time.
- 12 April – HMAS Australia is scuttled off Sydney Heads.
- 28 April – In the Parliament of Victoria, the coalition between the Nationalist Party and the Country Party breaks down. Premier Harry Lawson retires to the backbench, and Sir Alexander Peacock is sworn in as Premier.
- 12 May – Royal assent is given to the Parliamentary Elections (Women Candidates) Act 1924, allowing women to stand for parliament in Victoria.
- 26 June – A general election is held in Victoria.
- 18 July – After the Victorian state election, the Country Party agrees to support a minority Labor government, and George Prendergast is sworn in as Premier of Victoria.
- 29 July – The 1924 NSWRFL season culminates in Balmain's victory over South Sydney in the final.
- 10 October – The Commonwealth Electoral Act 1918 is enacted making voting in federal elections compulsory (the next federal election would be held on 14 November 1925).
- 13 October – the inaugural Better Farming Train commenced a tour of Gippsland, Victoria.
- 18 November – The Country Party resolves its differences with the Nationalist Party, and votes to defeat Premier George Prendergast in the Victorian Legislative Assembly. Country Party leader John Allan replaces him as Premier of Victoria.
- Mosman Golf Club established.
- Mulyie (about 60 miles or 100 kilometres east of Port Hedland) becomes the only station in Australia to ever record zero rainfall for an entire calendar year.

== Arts and literature ==
- Miss Collins, a portrait of Gladys Neville Collins by William Beckwith McInnes is awarded the Archibald Prize

== Sport ==
- The 1924 NSWRFL season is won by Balmain, who defeated South Sydney 3–0 in the premiership final.
- The Melbourne Cup was won by six-year-old stallion Backwood (ridden by Bunty Brown, trained by Richard 'Dick' Bradfield and owned by W Clark, Allen Hughes & Baillieu). He was the fourth and final winner of the race trained by Bradfield. The race was won in a time of 3:26.5 with a field of eighteen. Stand By (Bobby Lewis/James Scobie) and Spearfelt (E O'Sullivan/V O'Neill) placed second and third.

== Births ==
- 1 January – Elizabeth McKinnon, Olympic sprinter (died 1981)
- 24 January – Catherine Hamlin, obstetrician and gynaecologist (died 2020)
- 29 February – David Beattie, Governor-General of New Zealand (died 2001)
- 2 April – Milton Morris, New South Wales politician (died 2019)
- 11 April – Frank Wilson, actor (died 2005)
- 17 April – Kenneth Norman Jones, public servant (died 2022)
- 25 April – Peter Abeles, businessman (died 1999)
- 25 April – Eric D'Arcy, Catholic Archbishop of Hobart (died 2005)
- 3 May – Ken Kearney, rugby league player (died 2006)
- 5 May – Gordon Jackson, businessman (died 1991)
- 31 May – Patsy Adam-Smith, author and historian (died 2001)
- 3 June – Eric Neal, Governor of South Australia (1996–2001) (died 2025)
- 12 June – June Mendoza, portrait painter (died 2024)
- 24 June – Brian Bevan, rugby league player (died 1991)
- 29 June – Eric Worrell, RAAF pilot (died 1993)
- 5 July – Edward Cassidy, Catholic cardinal (d. 2021)
- 7 July – Graham Dunscombe, Australian rules footballer (died 2020)
- 15 July – Hugh Stretton, historian (died 2015)
- 19 July – Raymond Specht, botanist (died 2021)
- 3 August – Max Oldmeadow, politician (died 2013)
- 23 August – David Boyd, artist (died 2011)
- 5 September – Frank Armitage, artist for Disney (died 2016)
- 12 September – Steve Marsh, Australian rules footballer (died 2024)
- 13 September – Harold Blair, tenor and Aboriginal activist (died 1976)
- 27 September – Charlotte MacGibbon, javelin thrower (died 2009)
- 1 October – Leonie Kramer, academic and educator (died 2016)
- 5 October – Kenneth Jack, artist (died 2006)
- 25 October – Paul Rigby, cartoonist (died 2006)
- 26 October – Reg Withers, Senator for Western Australia (died 2014)
- 10 November – Bobby Limb, entertainer (died 1999)
- 21 November – David Thomson, politician (died 2013)
- 22 November – Les Johnson, politician (died 2015)
- 28 November – Harry Bath, rugby league footballer and coach (died 2008)
- 3 December – John Winter, Olympic high jumper (died 2007)
- 15 December – Noel Hush, chemist (died 2019)
- 17 December – Clifton Pugh, artist (died 1990)

== Deaths ==
- 23 January – Chas Brownlow (born 1861), Australian rules football administrator
- 20 January – Henry "Ivo" Crapp (born 1872), VFL umpire
- 3 March – John Ramsay (born 1841), businessman
- 12 March – Henry Deane (born 1847), engineer and botanist
- 25 March – John Reedman (born 1865), cricketer and Australian rules footballer
- 1 April – Stan Rowley (born 1876), Olympic sprinter
- 1 May – Arthur McCabe, Olympic rugby union player (b. 1887)
- 9 May – Edward Henry Embley (born 1861), doctor
- 2 June – Anselm Bourke (born 1835), Catholic priest
- 19 July – Kingsley Fairbridge (born 1885), child emigration pioneer
- 30 August – Gerald Sharp (born 1865), Anglican clergyman
- 19 September – Alick Bannerman (born 1854), cricketer
- 19 September – Henry George Smith (born 1852), chemist
- 22 October – Sir William Loton (born 1839), Western Australian politician
- 29 October – John Marden (born 1855), teacher and headmaster

== See also ==
- List of Australian films of the 1920s
