= 1923 in Australia =

- Decades: 1900s; 1910s; 1920s; 1930s; 1940s
- See also: 1923 in Australian literature; Other events of 1923; Timeline of Australian history

The following lists events that happened during 1923 in Australia.

1923 in Australia
- Monarch: George V
- Governor-General: Henry Forster
- Prime minister: Billy Hughes, then Stanley Bruce
- Population: 5,693,369
- Elections: Queensland

== Incumbents ==
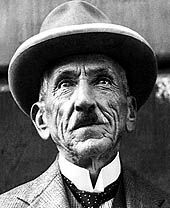
Billy Hughes

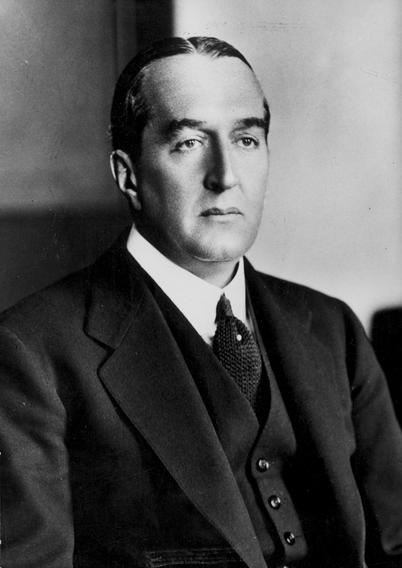
Stanley Bruce

- Monarch – George V
- Governor General – Henry Forster
- Prime Minister – Billy Hughes (until 8 February), then Stanley Bruce
- Chief Justice – Adrian Knox

=== State premiers ===
- Premier of New South Wales – George Fuller
- Premier of Queensland – Ted Theodore
- Premier of South Australia – Henry Barwell
- Premier of Tasmania – John Hayes (until 13 August), then Sir Walter Lee (until 25 October), then Joseph Lyons
- Premier of Victoria – Harry Lawson
- Premier of Western Australia – James Mitchell

=== State governors ===
- Governor of New South Wales – Sir Walter Davidson (until 16 September)
- Governor of Queensland – Sir Matthew Nathan
- Governor of South Australia – Sir Tom Bridges
- Governor of Tasmania – none appointed
- Governor of Victoria – George Rous, 3rd Earl of Stradbroke
- Governor of Western Australia – Sir Francis Newdegate

== Events ==
- 8 February – Billy Hughes resigns as Prime Minister, after the Country Party refuses to govern in coalition with him as the leader of the Nationalist Party. Hughes is succeeded by his Treasurer, Stanley Bruce.
- 25 April – The first Anzac Day dawn service is held in Albany, Western Australia.
- 28 April – Construction commences on the Sydney Harbour Bridge.
- 1 to 30 April – A uniquely dry month over southeastern Australia due to a persistent block sees the driest month on record over Victoria with only 0.062 inches or 1.58 millimetres and Tasmania with only 0.33 inches or 8.37 millimetres. Melbourne has its only rainless month since at least 1855.
- 1 to 31 May – Following on the record dry April, Tasmania's weather reverses so abruptly that May remains the state's wettest month since at least 1900 with a statewide average of 13.66 inches or 346.88 millimetres. The wet weather would continue for another eleven months so that May 1923 to April 1924 received a statewide average rainfall of 82.36 inches or 2,091.87 millimetres – the wettest twelve months on record over Tasmania.
- 14 August – John Hayes resigns as Premier of Tasmania after failing to resolve Tasmania's financial crisis. Sir Walter Lee becomes Premier for the second time.
- 28 August – Construction begins on the Provisional Parliament House in Canberra.
- 7 September – Harry Lawson assumes office for a second term as Premier of Victoria, forming a National-Country Party ministry.
- 10 October – Telephone link between Sydney and Brisbane officially opened.
- 12 October – Cairns, Queensland is proclaimed a city.
- 14 October – Severe floods in Melbourne, two people drown.
- 25 October – Sir Walter Lee is defeated in a no-confidence motion, and Joseph Lyons becomes Premier of Tasmania.
- 31 October – The Marble Bar heat wave begins, which by 7 April 1924 will hold the world record for the longest number of consecutive days (160) in which a temperature above 100 °F or 37.8 °C was recorded.
- 1 November – The 1923 Victorian Police strike begins, with half of the Victoria Police force standing down over the use of labour spies. Rioting and looting takes place in the Melbourne city centre.

== Arts and literature ==
- D. H. Lawrence publishes Kangaroo, his first novel with an Australian setting.

== Sport ==
- 20 October – Essendon wins the Premiership of the 1923 VFL season, defeating Fitzroy 8.15 (63) to 6.10 (46) at the MCG.
- Bitalli wins the Melbourne Cup
- Wynette wins the Caulfield Cup
- New South Wales wins the Sheffield Shield
- The 1923 NSWRFL Premiership culminates in Eastern Suburbs' 15–12 victory over South Sydney in the final.

== Births ==
- 3 January – Bud Tingwell, actor (died 2009)
- 1 February – John Perceval, artist (died 2000)
- 4 February – James Dibble, journalist (died 2010)
- 18 February – Donald Dunstan, army officer and Governor of South Australia (died 2011)
- 1 March – Guy Griffiths, naval officer (died 2024)
- 15 March – Lou Richards, Australian Rules footballer and media personality (died 2017)
- 25 April – Eric Rolls, writer (died 2007)
- 5 May – Helen Cutler, charity worker and patron (died 1990)
- 21 May – Dorothy Hewett, poet and playwright (died 2002)
- 3 June – June Newton, actress and photographer (died 2021)
- 15 June – Ninian Stephen, Governor General of Australia (died 2017)
- 24 June – Margaret Olley, painter (died 2011)
- 25 June – Harry Seidler, architect (died 2006)
- 9 July – Beryl Nashar, geologist (died 2012)
- 28 July – Theo Bruce, long jumper (died 2002)
- 4 August – Reg Grundy, media owner (died 2016)
- 30 August – Charmian Clift, writer (died 1969)
- 4 September – Peter Ryan, writer (died 2015)
- 7 September
  - Nancy Keesing, poet (died 1993)
  - Bill Nankivell, politician (died 2024)
- 20 September – Eleanor Witcombe, screenwriter (died 2018)
- 24 September – Beryl Beaurepaire, political activist, feminist and philanthropist (died 2018)
- 15 October – Lindsay Thompson, Premier of Victoria (died 2008)
- 23 October – Don Banks, composer (died 1980)
- 26 November – Tom Hughes, barrister and Attorney-General (died 2024)
- 27 November – Joan Bielski, women's rights activist (died 2012)
- 28 November – Lorna Beal, cricketer (died 2020)
- 13 December – Edward Clancy, Roman Catholic bishop and cardinal (died 2014)

== Deaths ==
- 18 January – James Walker, New South Wales politician (born in the United Kingdom) (b. 1841)
- 23 January – Alicia O'Shea Petersen, suffragist and social reformer (b. 1862)
- 14 February – Margaret McLean, temperance and women's rights advocate (born in Scotland) (b. 1845)
- 20 February – Abraham Tobias Boas, rabbi (born in the Netherlands) (b. 1842)
- 22 February – John Jenkins, 22nd Premier of South Australia (born in the United States and died in the United Kingdom) (b. 1851)
- 13 March – Flora Mary Campbell, botanist (b. 1845)
- 18 March – Thomas Allwright Dibbs, banker (b. 1833)
- 2 June – Ted Banfield, naturalist and author (born in the United Kingdom) (b. 1852)
- 4 June – Hume Nisbet, novelist and artist (born and died in the United Kingdom) (b. 1849)
- 6 June – Sir Denison Miller, banker (b. 1860)
- 30 June – John Henry Nicholson, teacher and writer (born in the United Kingdom) (b. 1838)
- 26 July – Bella Guerin, feminist and suffragist (b. 1858)
- 22 August – Sir James Burns, businessman, shipowner and philosopher (born in the United Kingdom) (b. 1846)
- 30 August – Sir Pope Cooper, 4th Chief Justice of Queensland (b. 1846)
- 14 September – Edward Millen, New South Wales politician (born in the United Kingdom) (b. 1860)
- 26 September – Charles Scrivener, surveyor and public servant (b. 1855)
- 27 October – Brigid McGuigan, superior general of the Sisters of Charity of Australia (b. 1842)
- 5 November – Dowell O'Reilly, New South Wales politician, poet and writer (b. 1865)
- 27 November – Penleigh Boyd, artist (born in the United Kingdom) (b. 1890)
- 15 December – Frank Morton, journalist and poet (born in the United Kingdom) (b. 1869)
- 23 December – Sir John Gordon, South Australian politician and judge (born in the United Kingdom) (b. 1850)

== See also ==
- List of Australian films of the 1920s
