= Should a Doctor Tell? =

Should a Doctor Tell? may refer to:

- Should a Doctor Tell? (1930 film), a 1930 British drama film
- Should a Doctor Tell? (1923 film), a 1923 Australian silent film
