= High Heels (disambiguation) =

High heels are a type of shoe.

High Heels may also refer to:

- High Heels (1918 film), directed by P.J. Ramster
- High Heels (1921 film), directed by Lee Kohlmar
- High Heels (1991 film), directed by Pedro Almodóvar
- High Heels (Brave Girls EP), 2016, or the title song
- High Heels (CLC EP), 2016, or the title song
- "High Heels" (JoJo song), 2016
- "High Heels" (Melanie C song), 2019
- "High Heeled Shoes" (song), 2017 song by Megan McKenna

== See also ==
- "High Heel Sneakers", a 1963 blues song by Tommy Tucker
