= Reginald Murray =

Reginald Murray may refer to:

- Reg Herbert Murray (1918–1942), Australian private who was executed in the Ration Truck massacre
- Reg Murray (1909–1962), Australian politician
- Reginald Augustus Frederick Murray (1846–1925), Australian geologist
