= Triumph of Love =

The triumph of love has been a popular allegory in art since at least the Italian Renaissance. It is especially popular in domestic items such as desci da parto and cassoni.

Triumph of Love or The Triumph of Love may also refer to:

== Books ==
- The Triumph of Love (play), a 1732 play by Marivaux
- Triumph of Love, a 14th-century poem by Petrarch, in the Triumphs
- The Triumph of Love, poems by Edmond Holmes 1902
- The Triumph of Love, a sonnet-sequence by Govinda Krishna Chettur 1932
- Triumph of Love, a romantic novel by Barbara McMahon 1995
- The Triumph of Love, a poetry collection by Geoffrey Hill 1999

== Film ==
- The Triumph of Love (1922 film), an Australian silent film
- Triumph of Love (1929 film), a German silent film
- Triumph of Love (1938 film), an Italian film
- Triumph of Love (2001 film), a film based on the play
- Triunfo del amor (Triumph of Love), a 2011 telenovela

== Music ==
- Triomphe de l'Amour, a 1681 ballet composed by Jean-Baptiste Lully
- Triumph of Love (musical), a 1997 musical based on the play
- Le Triomphe de l'amour (album), a 2001 album by Areski
