= The Rushing Tide =

1927 film

- Directed by: Gerald M. Hayle
- Written by: Gerald M. Hayle
- Produced by: Gerald M. Hayle
- Starring: Beth Darvall
- Cinematography: Tasman Higgins
- Production company: Koala Films
- Release dates: 19 October 1927 (preview); 5 February 1928
- Running time: 6,500 feet
- Country: Australia
- Languages: Silent film English intertitles

The Rushing Tide is a 1927 Australian silent film about the search for a hoard of diamonds. It was not a success at the box office and is considered a lost film.

== Plot ==
Harold Wilson inherits a map showing the location of a hoard of diamonds. He sets out to find them with Howard Morrison and his wife. On a lonely stretch of the coast they meet Ruth Jeffries and her father, a fugitive from the police, who has the diamonds. Howard steals the diamonds, kills Jeffries, abducts Ruth, and puts Harold and his wife in an open boat out to sea. Mrs Morrison dies, but Harold is rescued. He tracks down Ruth, saves her from Howard – who has discovered the diamonds are worthless – and marries Ruth.

== Cast ==
- Beth Darvall as Ruth Jeffries
- Norman Lee as Harold Wilson
- Irish Roderick as Mrs Morrison
- Godfrey Cass as Howard Morrison
- Eardley Turner as Jeffries
- Dora Mostyn
- Edwin Lester
- Barry Lock
- Brian Ewart
- W. Lane Bayliff

== Production ==
The film reunited director Gerald Hayle with Beth Darvall, the star of his previous film, Environment (1927). It was shot in July 1927 partly in an old cinema in the Melbourne suburb of Glenhuntly which had been converted into a studio, with location work done near Portsea, Victoria, at Sorrento, Beauamris and Black Bock, Melbourne.

== Release ==
The movie made a reported profit of £650.

Hayle announced plans to make another movie with Darvall, The Sanctuary. It does not appear to have been made, but they worked together again on Tiger Island (1930).
