= John Challis (disambiguation) =

John Challis (1942–2021) was a British actor.

John Challis is also the name of:

- John Challis (activist) (born 1928), Australian activist
- John Challis (harpsichord) (1907–1974), American musical instrument builder
- John Henry Challis (1809–1880), Anglo-Australian merchant and philanthropist
