= The Unsleeping Eye =

The Unsleeping Eye may refer to:

- The Unsleeping Eye (novel), a 1974 science fiction novel by D. G. Compton
- The Unsleeping Eye (film), a 1928 British film
