= Greg Palmer (disambiguation) =

Greg Palmer may refer to:

- Greg Palmer, American journalist
- Greg Palmer (Australian filmmaker), Australian filmmaker
- Gregg Palmer, American actor
- Gregory V. Palmer, American Methodist bishop
