= Erlistoun =

Pastoral lease in Western Australia

Coordinates: 28.343°S 122.144°E

Location in Western Australia

Erlistoun Station is a pastoral lease that has operated as a cattle station and more recently as a sheep station in Western Australia.

It is approximately 72 kilometres (45 mi) north of Laverton and 162 kilometres (101 mi) east of Leinster in the Goldfields-Esperance region. Borodale Creek runs through the property from Davis Pool on the northern boundary meandering through waterholes to Namendarra Lake on the southern boundary.

Erlistoun was known as a district in the area before the station was established. The lease was first taken up by Butcher and Uhr in 1904, originally on a block extending northward from Laverton for 55 miles (89 km) with a width of 40 miles (64 km). The company was initially running cattle at Erlistoun, 1,000 head of which they had overlanded down from the Kimberley.

The Emanuel brothers owned the property in 1911 when it was sold to Kalgoorlie-Boulder Firewood Company. At this time, the property occupied an area of 519,000 acres (210,032 ha) and was still running cattle. In 1924, the property was estimated to be carrying 5,500 head of cattle. By 1925 the size of the property was estimated at 1,000,000 acres (404,686 ha) and it was stocked with 4,000 head of cattle. Sheep had been introduced to the property by this time and in 1926 it was stocked with 7,000 cattle and 5,000 sheep. Shearing the same year yielded 31 bales of wool per 1,000 sheep. Another 4,000 sheep were due to arrive at the station in late 1926.

Erlistoun was the initial location of the first feature-length film shot in Western Australia; scenes for the film Down Under, directed by Harry Southwell, were shot at the station in 1926.

The area received heavy rains in 1929, with Erlistoun recording over 0.5 inches (13 mm) in 24 hours and over 8 inches (200 mm) in total for the month. The normally dry creek ran for a length of over 20 miles (32 km) through the property. In 1930, the property was running a flock of 13,000 sheep. In the same year the Kalgoorlie-Boulder Firewood company changed its name to the Erlistoun Pastoral Company; the directors were Alex Porter, J. McCalmont and E.H. Jolly.

In 2003 the property was being plagued by wild dogs attacking the sheep. Other properties in the area were similarly affected.

The area is popular amongst gold prospectors. Guest accommodation is available on Erlistoun in the shearers' quarters.

== See also ==
- List of ranches and stations
- List of pastoral leases in Western Australia
