= Caught in the Net =

Caught in the Net may refer to:

- Caught in the Net (1928 film)
- Caught in the Net (2020 film)
