= Should Girls Kiss Soldiers? =

1918 film by P. J. Ramster

- Directed by: P. J. Ramster
- Written by: P. J. Ramster
- Based on: a play by P. J. Ramster
- Produced by: P. J. Ramster
- Production company: P. J. Ramster Photoplays
- Release date: 1918
- Running time: One-reel
- Country: Australia
- Languages: Silent; English intertitles

Should Girls Kiss Soldiers? is a 1918 Australian short silent film directed by P. J. Ramster, based on a play he had written.

It was the first of several movies Ramster made titled with rhetorical questions.

It is considered a lost film.
