= Cattiva Evasione =

1923 film

- Directed by: P. J. Ramster
- Written by: Angelo Zommo
- Produced by: P. J. Ramster
- Starring: Thelma Newling
- Release date: 1923
- Country: Australia
- Languages: Silent film English intertitles

Cattiva Evasione, also known as A Naughty Elopement, is a 1923 Australian silent film directed by P. J. Ramster. It was made for Sydney's Italian community, with a story by a local Italian actor, Angelo Zommo.

It is considered a lost film.
