= Arthur Wilson (gynaecologist) =

Personal information
- Full name: Arthur Mitchell Wilson
- Born: 24 August 1888; South Melbourne
- Died: 19 December 1947 (aged 59); Richmond, Victoria
- Original team: Scotch College
- Position: Back pocket/half-back

Playing career^{1}
Years	Club	Games (Goals)
1909–1911	University	51 (3)
- ^{1} Playing statistics correct to the end of 1911.

Arthur Mitchell Wilson (24 August 1888 – 19 December 1947) DSO was a gynaecologist and obstetrician and an Australian rules footballer who played for the University Football Club in the Victorian Football League (VFL).

He was a foundation fellow of the Royal College of Obstetricians and Gynaecologists.

The Arthur Wilson Memorial Scholarship was established in 1987 with funds from the Arthur Wilson Memorial Foundation. The Foundation had been created in 1951 after a public appeal was launched to perpetuate the memory of Arthur Wilson, an outstanding gynaecologist and obstetrician. The Foundation raised funds for the Arthur Wilson Memorial Wing (1954) to be built as an extension to the south side of the Royal Society of Victoria's Hall (1859) at 8 La Trobe St, Melbourne to house the Royal Australian College of Obstetricians and Gynaecologists.

His son Mac played league football for Melbourne in the 1940s.

== Sources ==
- https://web.archive.org/web/20091024124232/http://www.ranzcog.edu.au/research/arthurwilson.shtml
