= 1927 in Australia =

- Monarch: George V
- Governor-General: John Baird
- Prime minister: Stanley Bruce
- Population: 6,182,488
- Elections: WA, SA, NSW, VIC

- Decades: 1900s; 1910s; 1920s; 1930s; 1940s
- See also: 1927 in Australian literature; Other events of 1927; Timeline of Australian history

The following lists events that happened during 1927 in Australia.

== Incumbents ==
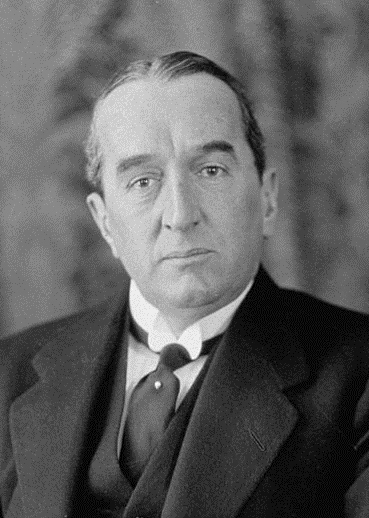
Stanley Bruce

- Monarch – George V
- Governor-General – John Baird, 1st Viscount Stonehaven
- Prime Minister – Stanley Bruce
- Chief Justice – Adrian Knox

=== State premiers ===
- Premier of New South Wales – Jack Lang (until 18 October) then Thomas Bavin
- Premier of Queensland – William McCormack
- Premier of South Australia – Lionel Hill (until 8 April) then Richard Layton Butler
- Premier of Tasmania – Joseph Lyons
- Premier of Victoria – John Allan (until 20 May) then Edmond Hogan
- Premier of Western Australia – Philip Collier

=== State governors ===
- Governor of New South Wales – Sir Dudley de Chair
- Governor of Queensland – Sir John Goodwin (from 13 July)
- Governor of South Australia – Sir Tom Bridges (until 4 December)
- Governor of Tasmania – Sir James O'Grady
- Governor of Victoria – Arthur Somers-Cocks, 6th Baron Somers
- Governor of Western Australia – Sir William Campion

== Events ==
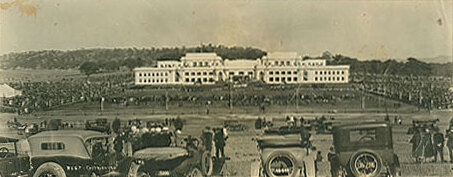
Parliament House Opening, 1927

- 1 February – The North Australia Act of 1926 is enforced and the territory of Central Australia is created.
- 8 February – A cyclone makes landfall north of Cairns, causing flooding at Halifax Bay, Ingham, Innisfail, Tully, Cardwell and Townsville. Thirty-six people are killed, and twenty are missing.
- 9 April – A general election is held in Victoria.
- 3 May – The Australasian Council of Trade Unions is formed at the All-Australian Trade Union Congress in Melbourne.
- 9 May – Parliament House in Canberra is officially opened by the Duke of York.
- 20 May – Following a swing to the ALP in the Victorian election, Edmond Hogan forms a minority Labor government with Progressive support, and takes over as Premier of Victoria from John Allan.
- 29 June – Charles Kingsford Smith and his copilot Charles Ulm complete a round-Australia flight in ten days, five-and-a-half hours.
- 27 October – Melbourne gangster Squizzy Taylor is killed in a shootout with Sydney gangsters (including Snowy Cutmore, who also dies) in Carlton.
- 3 November – The Sydney ferry Greycliffe is cut in half by the liner RMS Tahiti, killing 40 persons.

== Science and technology ==
- Professor Thomas Parnell begins the pitch drop experiment at the University of Queensland. It will go on to become the world's longest continuously running scientific experiment.

== Arts and literature ==
- George Washington Lambert's portrait, Mrs Annie Murdoch wins the Archibald Prize

== Sport ==
- 27 August – Robert Ferguson McMurdo wins the men's national marathon title, clocking 3:06:26 in Sydney.The race was not considered an official Australian championship by the National Athletics Federation even though all the top runners from all over Australia were competing.The Cup, however, reads "Australian Marathon Championship" 27/08/27.
- 17 September - The 1927 NSWRFL season culminates in South Sydney's 20–11 victory over St. George in the final.
- 24 September – Collingwood become premiers of the 1927 VFL season, defeating Richmond 2.13 (25) to 1.7 (13) in the 1927 grand final.
- 1 November – Trivalve wins the Melbourne Cup.
- South Australia wins the Sheffield Shield

== Births ==
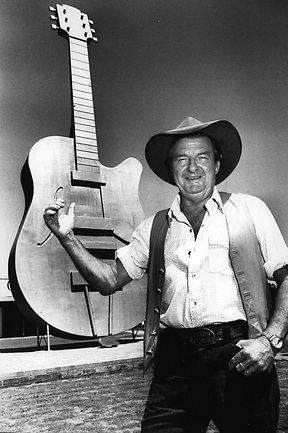
Slim Dusty

- 20 January – Dawn Lake, entertainer (died 2006)
- 21 January – Clive Churchill, rugby league player (died 1985)
- 23 January – Fred Williams, painter and printmaker (died 1982)
- 18 March – Max Bingham, politician (died 2021)
- 20 March – Wally Grout, cricket player (died 1968)
- 1 April – Peter Cundall, horticulturist and television presenter (died 2021)
- 15 April – Bob Ellicott, lawyer, politician and judge (died 2022)
- 1 May – Michael Charlton, journalist and broadcaster (died 2025)
- 2 May - Ray Barrett, actor (died 2009)
- 6 May – Max Hazelton, aviator (died 2023)
- 30 May – Billy Wilson, St George rugby league captain (died 1993)
- 6 June
  - Maureen Jones, pianist (died 2026)
  - Alan Seymour, playwright (died 2015)
- 10 June – Bede Morris, immunologist (died 1988)
- 11 June – Richard Woolcott, diplomat and public servant (died 2023)
- 13 June – Slim Dusty, country and western singer (died 2003)
- 3 July – Peter Muller, architect (died 2023)
- 6 July – Alan Freeman, Australian-born broadcaster (died 2006)
- 13 July – Ian Reed, discus thrower (died 2020)
- 16 July – Geoffrey Martin, Australian rules footballer (died 2020)
- 17 July – Trixie Gardner, Baroness Gardner of Parkes, Australian-English dentist and politician (died 2024)
- 14 August – Sid Patterson, cyclist (died 1999)
- 24 August – David Ireland, novelist (died 2022)
- 22 September – Hal Nerdal, skier (died 2023)
- 25 September – Val Jellay, actress (d. 2017)
- 29 October – Frank Sedgman, tennis player
- 10 November – Richard Connolly, composer and ABC personality (died 2022)
- 11 November – Jack Absalom, artist, author and adventurer (died 2019)
- 14 November – Bart Cummings, Australia's Best Racehorse Trainer (12 Melbourne Cup wins) (died 2015)
- 28 December – Ron Casey, Australian rules football administrator and media personality (died 2000)

== Deaths ==
- 7 January – Robert Jones, Irish-born Australian politician (born 1845)
- 15 March – Hector Rason, Premier of Western Australia (born 1858)
- 31 March – Paris Nesbit, lawyer (born 1852)
- 2 April – Edward Davies, architect (born 1852)
- 26 October – Squizzy Taylor, gangster (born 1888)
- 13 December – Stephen Henry Parker, Chief Justice of the Supreme Court of Western Australia (born 1846)

== See also ==
- List of Australian films of the 1920s
