= Gerald M. Hayle =

Australian film director and screenwriter

Gerald M. Hayle was an Australian film director and screenwriter. He made a number of industrial movies in Melbourne before moving into feature films in the late 1920s. None of his films were successful commercially.

== Filmography ==
- Environment (1927)
- The Rushing Tide (1927)
- Tiger Island (1930)
