= The Mail Robber =

1925 Australian film by Greg Palmer

- Directed by: Greg Palmer
- Written by: Greg Palmer
- Produced by: Greg Palmer
- Starring: Greg Palmer
- Production company: Palmer Pictures
- Release date: 1925
- Running time: 200 feet
- Country: Australia
- Languages: Silent film; English intertitles

The Mail Robber is a 1925 short Australian film made by Greg Palmer when he was fifteen.

Part of the film survives today.

== Plot ==
A robber steals a mail bag and is chased through a park.

== Production ==
Palmer took five years to raise the money.

== Reception ==
The film made £650 in profit.
