= Stan Obst =

Australian rules footballer

Personal information
- Full name: Stanley James Obst
- Born: 1 July 1926; Albury, New South Wales
- Died: 22 December 2005 (aged 79)
- Original team: West Albury (O&MFL)
- Height: 179 cm (5 ft 10 in)
- Weight: 75 kg (165 lb)

Playing career^{1}
Years	Club	Games (Goals)
1945	St Kilda	2 (0)
- ^{1} Playing statistics correct to the end of 1945.

Stanley James Obst (1 July 1926 – 22 December 2005) was an Australian rules footballer who played with St Kilda in the Victorian Football League (VFL).

Obst played his two games for St Kilda while serving in the Royal Australian Air Force as a Leading Aircraftman with 1 Stores Depot during World War II.
