= The Hordern Mystery =

1920 Australian film

- Directed by: Harry Southwell
- Written by: M.F. Gatwood
- Based on: novel by Edmund Finn
- Produced by: Harry Southwell
- Starring: Claude Turton; Flo Little
- Cinematography: Tasman Higgins
- Production company: Southwell Screen Plays
- Release date: 23 October 1920
- Running time: 5,600 feet
- Country: Australia
- Languages: Silent film English intertitles

The Hordern Mystery is a 1920 Australian film directed by Harry Southwell based on an 1889 novel by Edmund Finn (son of Edmund Finn). Unlike many Australian silent films, it still survives today.

== Plot ==
Money-hungry Gilbert Hordern is married to an adoring wife and has a child. He pretends to be his own evil twin brother so he can marry a millionaire's daughter. He succeeds but is wracked with guilt and confesses. He wakes up and realises it was all a dream.

== Cast ==
- Claude Turton as Gilbert Hordern
- Flo Little as Midge Hordern
- Floris St George as Laura Yellaboyce
- Godfrey Cass as Dan Yellaboyce
- Thomas Sinclair as Peter Mull
- Beatrice Hamilton as Mrs Mull
- David Edelsten

== Production ==
The film was shot in suburban Sydney in mid 1920 under the title The Golden Flame. Commercial reception appears to have been poor.
