= Down Under (1927 film) =

1927 film

- Directed by: Harry Southwell
- Starring: Harry Southwell; Nancy Mills
- Cinematography: Lacey Percival; Cliff Thomas
- Production company: Anglo-Australian Films
- Release dates: 22 March 1927 (premiere); 4 September 1929
- Country: Australia
- Languages: Silent film English intertitles

Down Under is an Australian feature-length film directed by Harry Southwell. It was the first full-length feature film made in Western Australia. It featured the outback, as well as Perth and Kings Park.

== Plot ==
An Australian vagabond, Walter Nobbage, has a series of adventures, including a trotting race meeting, a cattle muster and an aboriginal corroboree. Nobbage's sweetheart dies and he sacrifices his life for the safe her his dead sweetheart's little boy.

== Cast ==
- Harry Southwell
- Nancy Mills
- Ivy Deakin
- Alec Weird
- Mrs Compton
- L Laurence
- J Austin
- G Cotter
- G Temple-Poole
- J Hennessy
- D Brown
- J Southwell
- A Raven

== Production ==
The film was financed by West Australian businessmen and shot in that state at Erlistoun Station, Laverton and Perth.

Southwell claimed at the time he had a contract to make six films for distribution in Britain.

It was the first and only production of Anglo-Australian Films.

== Release ==
It premiered on 4 September 1929 in Perth at the Majestic Theatre. The film appears never to have received a commercial release in Britain

Southwell attempted to set up another company in Australia, Western Southwell Productions, aiming to make a £4,000 movie called Gold. This film was never made.
