= The Kingdom of Twilight =

1929 film

- Directed by: Alexander Macdonald
- Written by: Alexander Macdonald
- Produced by: Alexander Macdonald
- Starring: Wendy Osborne
- Cinematography: Walter Sully; Lacey Percival
- Edited by: Walter Sully
- Production company: Seven Seas Screen Productions
- Distributed by: Universal Pictures
- Release date: December 1929 (UK)
- Running time: 92 minutes
- Country: Australia
- Language: English
- Budget: more than £5,000

The Kingdom of Twilight is a 1929 British-Australian film directed by British author and explorer Alexander MacDonald.

It was filmed under the title Tanami, meaning "white feather".

It was one of the few Australian films made during the late 1920s, when local production went through a major slump. The movie was financed in Britain.

== Plot ==
Jim Carrington leaves England with his daughter Dorothy after a scandal, and seeks his fortune as a gold prospector in northern Australia. He learns of a mysterious tribe of aborigines but is wounded and captured by the tribe. He is given up for dead by everyone except for Dorothy who continues to search for him. She is captured by the tribe as well and discovers her father is alive. They return together to white civilisation where Dorothy is reunited with a young gold miner who loves her.

== Cast ==
- Wendy Osborne as Dorothy Carrington
- John Faulkner as Jim Carrington
- Robert Leslie Shepherd
- Rex Arnot as McCrimmon
- David Wallace as Reginald Carewe
- Len Norman as Tanami
- Laurel Macdonald as baby
- Herrick Corbett as Puggy Markham
- Jean Seton

== Production ==
Behind the scenes, 17 October 1928

MacDonald had previously made a film called The Unsleeping Eye (1928) in Papua, which was a commercial success. He reused many cast and crew on this film, including his wife, actor Wendy Osborne. MacDonald and Osborne also bought along their three year old daughter Laurel.

Jane Seton was a Scottish socialite.

The script appears to use elements of MacDonald's 1928 novel The Mystery of Diamond Creek.

MacDonald called the film "an attempt to capture the spirit of Australia, The bush prospector is the most romantic figure in Australia, but the world hears little of- him. It is the spirit of his work and service I shall try to portray."

Filming started in London in May 1928. MacDonald and his crew then travelled to Sydney. In June he said "I believe there is a great future for films'of the British-Empire; they can play a big part in knitting the Empire together, and in pushing the British name abroad."

The unit was based at Chillagoe in Queensland. Filming took reportedly three months on location with a crew of fourteen. Six of these were locals, the rest bought by MacDonald.

Local settlers and a reported 35 Aboriginal people helped out.

Scenes were shot at an old mining camp with an aboriginal corroboree staged in the Mungana Caves nearby. According to one report, "Scores of Newman flares were shot up in lighting these wonderful limestone formations, while the cameraman had narrow es- capes from serious injuries when dynamiting huge boulders for effect shots in sections of the story." There were also scenes shot at Walsh River.

Shooting was finished by September 1928. MacDonald was back in London by November.

Post production took place in Glasgow. In January 1929 it was announced the film's title had changed from Tanami to Kingdom of Twilight and that MacDonald and his crew would return to Australia later that year to make a third movie, based in the Solomon Islands.

== Release ==
The film was trade screened in London in January 1930. Liverpool Post praised the cinematography but called it "extremely old fashioned material."

The movie was never commercially released in Australia but was given some screenings. Reviewing a screening in Chillagoe in January 1932, the Cairns Post said "the picture stands on its own. The photography is clear. The acting natural and the scenery superb. Quite equal, if not, superior to anything turned out by America. All the local talent were easily recognised and loudly applauded. The aborigines' corroboree and imitation kangaroo hunt was very good."

The film was given some private screenings in 1933.

In September 1933 MacDonald returned to Australia and announced he planned to add sound to the film, and The Unsleeping Eye. This did happen for The Unsleeping Eye by 1937.
