= Bruce Tozer =

Australian cricketer (1926–2021)

Personal information
- Born: 27 June 1926; Hopetoun, Victoria, Australia
- Died: 15 December 2021 (aged 95); Queensland, Australia

Domestic team information
- Years: Team
- 1959: Victoria
- Source: Cricinfo, 3 December 2015

George Bruce Tozer (27 June 1926 – 15 December 2021) was an Australian cricketer. He played one first-class cricket match for Victoria in 1959. Tozer died in Queensland on 15 December 2021, at the age of 95.

== See also ==
- List of Victoria first-class cricketers
