= Creighton Burns =

Australian newspaper editor, journalist and academic

Creighton Burns AO
- Born: Creighton Lee Burns; 19 March 1925; Melbourne, Victoria, Australia
- Died: 19 January 2008 (aged 82); Malvern, Victoria, Australia
- Education: University of Melbourne; Nuffield College, Oxford; Balliol College, Oxford
- Occupation: Newspaper journalist
- Notable credit: Editor-in-chief of The Age

Creighton Lee Burns, AO (19 March 1925 – 19 January 2008) was an Australian journalist and academic, who was editor-in-chief of The Age newspaper in Melbourne from 1981 to 1989.

== Early life and naval career ==
Born in Melbourne, Burns attended Scotch College, and at the age of 15 became a cadet journalist at The Sun News-Pictorial.

In 1942, he joined the Royal Australian Navy, where he served as a sailor on board the cruiser HMAS Australia, the corvette HMAS Warrnambool and the destroyer HMAS Nepal.

== Academia ==
After World War II, Burns returned to Australia where he attended the University of Melbourne on a government grant, and achieved first-class honours in history. In 1941, Burns was named the Rhodes Scholar for Victoria. Prior to attending Oxford, Burns returned once again to journalism, briefly working for the news agency AAP-Reuters. At Oxford, Burns was granted scholarships to study at Nuffield and Balliol Colleges, where he gained first-class honours in philosophy, politics and economics, and a Master of Arts.

Returning to Australia in 1952, Burns took up a teaching position as a lecturer at Canberra University College. In 1953, he returned to the University of Melbourne as a senior lecturer and later reader in political science. He published Parties and People: A Survey Based on the La Trobe Electorate in 1961. In 1964, The Age newspaper offered him a position as their Southeast Asia foreign correspondent.

== The Age ==
For most of his tenure in Southeast Asia from 1964 to 1967, Burns was stationed in Saigon and Singapore, covering the Vietnam War. He was one of the first journalists to be taken out on patrol with the 1st Battalion, Royal Australian Regiment. He returned to Melbourne in 1967, as diplomatic and defence correspondent for The Age, later becoming the paper's assistant editor, then associate editor. In 1975, he was appointed U.S. correspondent at The Age's Washington, D.C. bureau, where he worked until 1981.

In 1981, Burns was appointed editor-in-chief at The Age. His appointment was controversial amongst the media community, as the appointment of an editor from an academic background was unusual. Despite his reluctance to take the post, Burns went on to become one of the paper's longest serving editors.

One of the biggest stories overseen by Burns was "The Age tapes" affair, a landmark in Australian judicial-political history. In February 1984, The Age obtained a series of recordings made by the New South Wales Police Force and the Australian Federal Police, which Burns published as a three-part series entitled 'Network of Influence'. The transcripts revealed conversations between High Court Judge Lionel Murphy and a magistrate, which led to a Royal Commission and the conviction of Justice Murphy on a charge of attempting to pervert the course of justice. The publication of the tapes also prompted the New South Wales government to pass the Listening Devices Act 1984, which tightened up the provisions of the 1969 Act under which the illegal police buggings and tapings had taken place.

Burns retired from The Age in 1989, but remained in public life as the chancellor of the Victoria University of Technology and president of the Melbourne Savage Club. He was made an Officer of the Order of Australia in the 1991 Australia Day honours, in recognition of service to the media and to international relations.

== Death ==
Creighton Burns died at Cabrini Hospital in Malvern on 19 January 2008, after a long battle with cancer. He was 82 years old. He was lauded by Premier of Victoria John Brumby as an "outstanding editor", a sentiment echoed by Brumby's predecessors, Jeff Kennett and Joan Kirner.

Media offices
Preceded by Michael Davie	Editor of The Age; 1981–1989	Succeeded by Mike Smith
