= Milton Clark =

Australian rules footballer

Personal information
- Full name: Milton Clark
- Born: 27 June 1922; Moonee Ponds, Victoria
- Died: 15 June 2018 (aged 95)
- Original team: Essendon Imperials
- Height: 180 cm (5 ft 11 in)
- Weight: 76 kg (168 lb)

Playing career^{1}
Years	Club	Games (Goals)
1945	Essendon	3 (0)
1946	North Melbourne	2 (0)
Total		5 (0)
- ^{1} Playing statistics correct to the end of 1946.

Milton Clark (27 June 1922 – 15 June 2018) was an Australian rules footballer who played with Essendon and North Melbourne in the Victorian Football League (VFL).

Clark was on Essendon's list from 1939, but his football career was restricted due to his service in the armed forces during World War II. Clark played in Essendon's reserves premiership in 1941 and played three senior games for the Bombers in 1945. He transferred to North Melbourne for the 1946 where he played two further VFL matches. Clark later played for several season with Essendon RSL after leaving the VFL. He worked as a fibrous plasterer until retiring in 1982.
