= Should a Girl Propose? =

1926 film

- Directed by: P.J. Ramster
- Written by: P.J. Ramster
- Produced by: P.J. Ramster
- Starring: Cecil Pawley
- Cinematography: Jack Fletcher
- Production company: P. J. Ramster Photoplays
- Release date: 24 April 1926
- Running time: 4,000 feet
- Country: Australia
- Languages: Silent film English intertitles

Should a Girl Propose? is a 1926 Australian silent film directed by P.J. Ramster set in the high society world of Sydney. The film featured several players from Ramster's acting school.

It is considered a lost film.

== Cast ==
- Cecil Pawley as Ellis Swift
- Thelma Newling as Esma
- Rex Simpson
- Joy Wood
- Norma Wood

== Reception ==
The film critic from the Sydney Morning Herald stated that:

To say that it is among the best of the Australian pictures presented within the last year or two is, unfortunately, not recommending it very highly. Providing one sees it in a good-humoured-frame of mind, there is mild entertainment, in it. One particularly satisfactory feature is the acting...
