= Rhonda Small =

Australian film director (1925–2014)

- Born: 5 November 1925; Melbourne, Australia
- Died: 21 January 2014 (aged 88); United Kingdom
- Occupation: Filmmaker

Rhonda Small (5 November 1925 – 21 January 2014) was an Australian filmmaker who worked at the Australian Commonwealth Film Unit, first as an editor then later as a director, between 1958 and 1967.

Born in Melbourne, Australia, Small moved to the United Kingdom in 1967, where she continued to edit and direct films on a freelance basis for companies including Anvil Film and Recording Companies.

== Career ==
Small was a fourth-generation Australian, descended from a ship's doctor on her father's side and a Presbyterian minister from Perthshire on her mother's. Small trained as a physiotherapist in Sydney. In 1955 she joined the family business (The Herbert Small Photographic Supply Stores) which was a retail chain selling AGFA film and cameras with outlets across Australia.

After several years developing skills in still photography and production techniques, Small spent time at a small advertising firm in Melbourne owned by the Herbert Small Group, where she was taught to edit moving pictures by John Dixon. She was also sent to Germany to learn about the Agfa colour process.

In 1958 Small joined the Film Australia Australian Commonwealth Film Unit under producer-in-chief Stanley Hawes. There she progressed from editing to directing and directed 13 films for the Film Unit between 1958 and 1967. In 1962 Small had a major entry at the Edinburgh Film Festival with Portrait of an Australian.

Small's films have been featured at the Melbourne International Film Festival with a showing of Australian Weekend in the 1960 festival programme, Portrait of an Australian in 1962, Workout in 1968, and both Suicide Trail and Dead on Their Feet in 1991, as part of the Retrospectives programme celebrating 40 years of the festival. Small was known for being a highly stylistic film maker, bringing an interesting visual expression to her films even though they were made as government-produced information films. Indeed, an essay published by Senses of Cinema opined that "She was perhaps the best director in the otherwise aesthetically lacklustre interregnum in filmmaking at the Commonwealth Film Unit occurring between the Golden Era of the 1940s, which featured docudrama stylists Colin Dean and John Heyer, and the reinvention and grooving up of the Unit under the production supervision of Gil Brealey and Richard Mason in the mid 1960s."

== Filmography ==
- Dead on Their Feet (1958)
- Canberra Today and Tomorrow (1959)
- Australian Weekend (1960)
- Suicide Trail (1960)
- Plant Quarantine at Work (1960)
- David and Jennifer Learn their Kurb Drill (1960)
- Cockpit Drill (1962)
- Portrait of an Australian (1962)
- Under Stress (1964)
- Life in Australia: Wagga Wagga (1965)
- Planning for Mental Health (1965)
- The Case for Books (1966)
- Into Your Hand (1966)
- Workout (1967)
- Sensibly to Sea (1968)
- Machine Age Medicare (1969)
- Engineering Rating (Work Study Rating Exercises) (1970)
- You, Your Pets and Neighbours (1972)
- Sweet Success (1973)
- Engineering Rating (Work Study Rating Exercises)] (1975)
- More Sweet Success (1977)

== Editing ==
- Electric Revolution (Great Britain, 1984)
- Living with Cystic Fibrosis (Great Britain, 1984)

== Later life ==
In 1967 Small moved to Wiltshire, England, to make a life with author and producer Stuart Legg. After his death in 1988 she remained in the United Kingdom.
