= Mosman Golf Club =

Former golf club in Sydney, New South Wales

- Interactive map of Mosman Golf Club
- 33°50′10″S 151°14′55″E

Club information
- Location: Middle Head
- Established: 1923
- Tota holes: 9

The Mosman Golf Club was established in 1923 on Middle Head, in the Sydney harbourside suburb of Mosman. The club officiated the construction and management of a 24 hectare, 9-hole golf course built on land acquired from the Commonwealth government under a 21-year lease on the condition that, if required, the land could be repossessed without compensation. This occurred in 1940, with the onset of World War II, when the Australian Government resumed the land and the clubhouse for military use. The club was closed consequently.

== See also ==
- List of golf courses in New South Wales
