= Thomas Perrin =

Australian cricketer

Personal information
- Born: 27 October 1928 (age 98); Melbourne, Australia

Domestic team information
- Years: Team
- 1950-1951: Victoria
- Source: Cricinfo, 2 December 2015

Thomas Perrin (born 27 October 1928) is an Australian former cricketer. He played two first-class cricket matches for Victoria between 1950 and 1951.

== See also ==
- List of Victoria first-class cricketers
