= The Rev. Dell's Secret =

1924 film

- Directed by: P. J. Ramster
- Written by: P. J. Ramster
- Produced by: P. J. Ramster
- Starring: Thelma Newling
- Cinematography: Jack Fletcher
- Production company: P. J. Ramster Photoplays
- Release date: 1 November 1924
- Running time: 6,000 feet
- Country: Australia
- Languages: Silent film; English intertitles
- Budget: less than £1,000

The Rev. Dell's Secret is a 1924 Australian silent film directed by P. J. Ramster. It is considered a lost film.

== Plot ==
Reverend David Dell (Rex Simpson) does missionary work in the Sydney underworld. He comes across a young girl, Juanita (Joy Wood), who is forced to dance in a sleazy cabaret after the death of her mother by Nick Grummit, a man who pretends to be her father. Dell tries to save her, taking her to a good home. But Grummit and his men track her down and Dell is blinded by a bottle in a fight to save her. Dell is looked after an admirer, Joyce (Thelma Newling), while Juanita goes on to become a star ballerina. Joyce dies and Dell and is reunited with the reverend.

== Cast ==
- Rex Simpson as David Dell
- Thelma Newling as Joyce
- William Shepherd
- Lyn Salter
- Joy Wood as Juanita

== Production ==
The film was shot on location in Sydney with cast largely drawn from Ramster's acting school.
