= Tiger Island (film) =

1930 film

- Directed by: Gerald M. Hayle
- Written by: Gerald M. Hayle
- Starring: Godfrey Cass
- Production company: Victorian Film Productions
- Release date: March 1930
- Country: Australia
- Language: Silent

Tiger Island is a 1930 silent Australian film about a father and daughter living on an island off the Victorian coast who become involved in drug running. It is considered a lost film.

== Plot ==
An old man and his beautiful daughter are lured to an island on the Victorian coast with the promise of a share in a deceased person's estate. The father finds the fortune was made from drug smuggling, the contraband being dropped off by passing steamers.

The old man joins the drug trade. A detective investigates and falls for the girl. The drug smuggler is unmasked, the old man is exonerated and the detective is united with the girl.

== Cast ==
- Beth Darvall
- John Barry
- Godfrey Cass
- Charles Brown
- Thelma Banks

== Production ==
The film was shot as a silent movie in 1929, in Melbourne and off the coast of Victoria. Advertisements for crew were listed in March, and the movie was complete by June. It was the second feature from the Victorian Film Production syndicate.

== Release ==
The coming of sound pictures limited its commercial chances.

The film was one of only four films entered in the Commonwealth government's £10,000 film competition. Of the four, it was judged the third best, after Fellers (1930) and The Cheaters (1930) but in front of The Nation of Tomorrow. However, only Fellers was ruled eligible for a prize.

=== Critical ===
The Bulletin wrote if the film "were five times better acted and five times better photographed, it would still be entirely negligible. It is the most actionless film ever conceived- Yet there is nothing lacking in the plot from that point of view... The producer has performed the remarkable feat, of draining this promising story of every bit of dramatic interest by presenting it in a series of glimpses of people talking, followed by sub-titles telling what they said... T Pictures like “Tiger Island” are likely to do more harm than good to the Australian industry, and speaking kindly of them doesn’t help, for movie audiences these days are entirely composed of connoisseurs."
