= P.J. Ramster =

Australian film director

Percy John Ramster (died 1941), better known as P.J. Ramster, was an Australian film director. He also ran an acting school, and his students often appeared in his films.

One of his students was Paulette McDonagh who, along with her sisters, hired Ramster to direct their first film, but removed him during production and Paulette took over.

Another one of Ramster's students was William Shepherd, who later went on to become one of the leading editors in Australia.

He worked for a time as an actor.

== Filmography ==
The majority of Ramster's films are considered lost or survive in very incomplete versions:

- High Heels (1918) – short
- Should Girls Kiss Soldiers? (1918) – short
- Jasamine Freckel's Love Affair (1921) – short
- Mated in the Wilds (1921)
- The Tale of a Shirt (1922) – short
- The Triumph of Love (1922)
- Should a Doctor Tell? (1923)
- Cattiva Evasione, aka or A Naughty Elopement (1923) – short
- The Rev. Dell's Secret (1924)
- Those Who Love (1926)
- Should a Girl Propose? (1926)
- The Russell Affair (1928)
