= George Palmer (filmmaker) =

Australian film maker (born 1909)

George Palmer (born 1909) was an Australian filmmaker. He went on to set up radio station 3AK in Melbourne.

He later went into travel, setting up Atlas World Tours. He also worked in three-dimensional films.

== Filmography ==
- The Mail Robber (1925)
- The Northbound Limited (1927)
