= High Heels (1918 film) =

- Directed by: P. J. Ramster
- Produced by: P. J. Ramster
- Starring: Fred Oppey; Elsa Granger
- Release date: 1918
- Running time: one-reel
- Country: Australia
- Languages: Silent film English intertitles

High Heels is a 1918 Australian short silent film directed by P. J. Ramster. It was his first film.

It is considered a lost film.
