= Flora Mary Campbell =

Australian botanist and botanical collector

- Born: 22 February 1845; Van Diemen's Land
- Died: 13 March 1923 (aged 78); Australia
- Other name: Flora Mary Martin
- Scientific career
- Fields: botany, mycology, cryptogams

Flora Mary Campbell (22 February 1845 – 13 March 1923), known in later life as Flora Mary Martin, was a professional female botanist working in Australia in the late 1800s. She collected type specimens of Goodenia pusilliflora F.Muell. and Dicranum senex Mull.Hal. as well as 82 fungi. The Department of Agriculture hired her in 1888 to investigate hop-spider in Gippsland, a position which promoted her from amateur (unpaid) to professional (paid) botanist.

== Professional work ==
Flora was interested in botany from at least age 24, when she taught herself the flora of Fulham by studying Balfour's Class Book of Botany and making extensive collections from the surrounding area. She began collecting specimens for Baron Ferdinand von Mueller in 1878, contributing to his eventual Flora australiensis, or the first flora of Australia. She collected for him for at least a decade. She is credited with collecting the type specimen for Goodenia pusilliflora which was described by Mueller in 1888. Her specimens are deposited in Royal Botanic Gardens Victoria, Queensland Herbarium, Royal Botanic Garden Edinburgh, Conservatoire et Jardin botaniques de la Ville de Genève, and Royal Botanic Gardens Kew. English mycologists Cooke and Masse described dozens of new species from her specimens and acknowledged her contributions by naming the genus Martinella after her.

In addition to her collections, Flora was a member of the Field Naturalists Club of Victoria (FNCV) and published several articles on cryptogams. The club, founded in 1880, allowed women from its founding. Flora was elected a member in July 1883 and she was the first woman to publish a paper in 1885. Soon after she was also the first woman to give a talk to the same club. It is likely that she was mentored by Daniel McAlpine whom she met through a mutual acquaintance through the FNCV.

In 1888, Flora was hired to investigate hop-spider damage in Gippsland. Two years later, she was the only woman to present a paper at the Australasian Association for the Advancement of Science 1890 conference. She lobbied heavily for the government of Victoria to create the position of "vegetable pathologist", only to have it to go to a man. This frustrated her enough to scrawl "the essence of insult" on a manuscript that was credited to McAlpine despite her substantial contributions.

Throughout her professional life, Flora corresponded with notable Australian scientists including Frederick Manson Bailey, Miles Joseph Berkeley, and Christopher Broome.

== Personal life ==
Flora was born to a Scottish immigrant father and Tasmanian mother on 22 February 1845. She had two younger siblings, Ann Eliza and Alexander Nicholson. She grew up in Melbourne, where her father was appointed harbormaster. When he retired in 1869, the family moved to Fulham, Gippsland. The Gippsland vegetation offered a rich and varied flora for her burgeoning interest in botany. Her botanical studies were interrupted when the family relocated to Scotland from 1877 to 1879.

In 1888, Flora married William Martin (c.1830-1909) and established a grazing property with him in Drouin. William predeceased her and the couple had no children. Flora left her scientific equipment and collections to the MacFarland Library at Ormond College, after which they disappear from the records. She died 13 March 1923 at age 78 of breast cancer.
