= The Northbound Limited =

1927 film

- Directed by: George Palmer
- Written by: George Palmer
- Produced by: George Palmer
- Starring: George Palmer
- Cinematography: Reg Edwards; Albert Drysdale
- Production company: Palmer Pictures
- Release date: 1927
- Running time: 43 mins (1,033 feet)
- Country: Australia
- Languages: Silent film English intertitles
- Budget: £3,000

The Northbound Limited is a 1927 Australian film. It was directed by George Palmer who was only 17 when he made it. A copy of the film exists at the National Film and Sound Archive.

== Plot ==
A brother and sister live on a farm in south-eastern New South Wales which possesses valuable timber. The timber is felled by a nearby mill owner for the benefit of the brother and sister, although at the time it appears to be a devious act. While the suspected villain rides on the Sydney Express (The Northbound Limited), he is chased by the brother and the mill owner's daughter. Following the train chase, the misunderstanding is revealed when the mill owner presents a cheque for felled timber from the land.

== Cast ==
- George Palmer
- Thelma Nelson
- Robert Williams
- Phyllis Blake

== Production ==
The film included documentary scenes of Melbourne, Wangaratta, and the country town of Seymour are shown. It took Palmer six months to make. It was finished in September 1926.

== Release ==
In December 1926 the film screened privately in Melbourne.
