= Neil O'Reilly =

Australian rules footballer

Personal information
- Full name: Neil Thomas O'Reilly
- Born: 26 July 1925; Melbourne, Victoria
- Died: 26 October 1985 (aged 60); Carrum, Victoria
- Height: 196 cm (6 ft 5 in)
- Weight: 99 kg (218 lb)

Playing career^{1}
Years	Club	Games (Goals)
1947	Fitzroy	1 (0)
- ^{1} Playing statistics correct to the end of 1947.

Neil Thomas O'Reilly (26 July 1925 – 26 October 1985) was an Australian rules footballer who played with Fitzroy in the Victorian Football League (VFL).
