= Mac Wilson (footballer, born 1922) =

Australian rules footballer

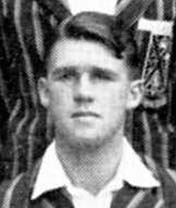

Personal information
- Full name: Arthur McLeod Wilson
- Born: 29 July 1922
- Died: 9 October 1996 (aged 74)
- Original team: Scotch College
- Height: 179 cm (5 ft 10 in)
- Weight: 78 kg (172 lb)

Playing career^{1}
Years	Club	Games (Goals)
1941	Melbourne	5 (2)
- ^{1} Playing statistics correct to the end of 1941.

Arthur McLeod "Mac" Wilson (29 July 1922 – 9 October 1996) was an Australian rules footballer who played with Melbourne in the Victorian Football League (VFL).

His father Arthur Wilson played league football for University Football Club and went on to become a leading obstetrician and gynecologist. His maternal grandfather was Bob McLeod, who played Test cricket for Australia.
