= William Mark Forster =

Australian philanthropist (1846–1921)

William Mark Forster (7 October 1846 – 6 June 1921) was an Australian philanthropist, founder of the Gordon Institute for Boys and City Newsboys' Society.
