= Teddy Long (footballer) =

Australian rules footballer

Personal information
- Full name: Teddy Long
- Born: 1 July 1921
- Died: 6 September 2008 (aged 87)
- Original team: Kensington
- Height: 168 cm (5 ft 6 in)
- Weight: 70 kg (154 lb)

Playing career^{1}
Years	Club	Games (Goals)
1942, 1946	North Melbourne	10 (7)
- ^{1} Playing statistics correct to the end of 1946.

Teddy Long (1 July 1921 – 6 September 2008) was an Australian rules footballer who played with North Melbourne in the Victorian Football League (VFL).
