= The Tale of a Shirt =

1922 film

- Directed by: P. J. Ramster
- Written by: Charles Russell
- Produced by: P. J. Ramster
- Starring: Charles Russell; Thelma Newling
- Production company: P. J. Ramster Photoplays
- Release date: 1922
- Running time: Two reels
- Country: Australia
- Languages: Silent film; English intertitles

The Tale of a Shirt is a 1922 Australian silent film directed by P. J. Ramster. It is a comedy about a man on holiday (Charles Russell) who learns he is not as old as he thought. Only a few fragments of the film survive.
