= Should a Doctor Tell? (1923 film) =

1923 film

- Directed by: P. J. Ramster; Alexander Butler
- Written by: P. J. Ramster
- Produced by: P. J. Ramster
- Starring: Fred Oppey
- Production company: P. J. Ramster Photoplays
- Release date: 18 August 1923
- Country: Australia
- Languages: Silent film English intertitles
- Budget: less than £1,000

Should a Doctor Tell? is a 1923 Australian silent film directed by P. J. Ramster and Alexander Butler. It is a high society melodrama about a man forced to be inspected by a doctor prior to his marriage, who discovers he has venereal disease.

It is considered a lost film.

== Plot ==
Dr Aubrey Mather, an advocate for compulsory medical examinations for both sexes prior to marriage, consents to the marriage of his daughter, Dorothy, to Count Delvo, on condition that he can present a clean bill of health. The Count is revealed to have a general disease. His doctor, Stirling Worth (Fred Oppey), advises him to postpone the wedding but the Count wants to go ahead and tells Dr Worth to remain silent. Worth is in love with Dorothy but agrees to take a bribe and not tell to care of his sick mother. But later, haunted by images of her having a crippled child, he ends up telling Dr Mather about his patient on the day of the wedding. The Count shoots Dr Worth and he dies in Dorothy's arms.

== Cast ==
- Fred Oppey as Dr Stirling Worth
- Thelma Newling
- Verna Haines
- Anne Parsons
- Teddy Austin as Bennie the cripple

== Production ==
The majority of the cast was drawn from Ramster's acting school. The censor passed the storyline because of its moral tone.

== Reception ==
The film was Ramster's most popular.
