= Reginald Augustus Frederick Murray =

Australian geologist and surveyor-general (1846–1925)

Reginald Augustus Frederick Murray (18 February 1846 – 5 September 1925) was a Victorian Government geologist and surveyor-general.

== Biography ==
Murray was born on 18 February 1846, in Frimley, Surrey, England, the eldest child of Captain Virginius Murray (1817–1861) and his wife Elizabeth Alice (née Poitiers). He went to Australia in 1855 with his mother, three years after his father. Murray was educated at Rev. T. P. Fenner's, (M.A.) private school in South Yarra. Murray left school in 1860, and worked on a cattle run near Avoca, Victoria and later had some success as a gold prospector.

Murray died in Caulfield, Victoria, on 5 September 1925, aged 79. He was married twice.

== Works ==
- Report on the extent of the deep leads of Victoria, Melbourne: Government Printer, 1898, Wikidata Q108402243
