= The Triumph of Love (1922 film) =

1922 film

- Directed by: P. J. Ramster
- Produced by: P. J. Ramster
- Starring: Jack Chalmers; Coo-ee Knight
- Cinematography: Jack Bruce; E.R. Jeffree
- Production company: P. J. Ramster Photoplays
- Release date: 24 June 1922
- Country: Australia
- Language: Silent (English intertitles)

The Triumph of Love is a 1922 Australian silent film directed by P. J. Ramster. It is a South Seas romance starring Jack Chalmers, a Sydney lifesaver who was famous at the time for trying to save a swimmer from a shark.

It is considered to be a lost film.

== Plot ==
Four men and a young woman (Coo-ee Knight) are shipwrecked on an island in the South Seas. The men fight over the woman.

== Production ==
The film was shot in April 1922, with interiors filmed the Palmerston studio in Waverley, and some location work in Queensland. The female lead Coo-Ee Knight was from Hobart.
