= John Challis (activist) =

Australian LGBT activist

John Challis (born 1928) is an Australian LGBT activist, known for his campaigns for equality in superannuation law. Challis makes media appearances as spokesman for the lobby group ComSuper Action Committee. MP Warren Entsch acknowledged Challis as being one of the leading campaigners for same-sex equality in Australia.

Challis worked for the ABC until 1988, before retiring. He and his partner survive from the income of his Commonwealth superannuation.

"I'm 79, my partner Arthur Cheeseman is 75. We've lived together for 40 years. Now I've got a Commonwealth pension. If I had a wife or a female de facto, if I died she would get two thirds of my pension for life. If I die first, Arthur gets nothing. That's the issue," said Challis. "While we were both still working, in order that I could put extra money into superannuation, we lived mostly on his wages. So the pension is part of his investment also. I'm worried about what will happen to my partner when I die."

As Australia's most vocal campaigner for same-sex superannuation reform, Challis said in 2007 that at age 79, he and his partner could not afford to be patient. The couple are planning for the possibility that Challis may die before the legislative changes occur.
