= The Unsleeping Eye (film) =

Film

The Unsleeping Eye is a 1928 British film written and directed by Alexander MacDonald. It was filmed on location in Papua.

The film starred MacDonald's wife, Wendy Osborne and was shot by Walter Sully. The film was shot in 1927.

MacDonald, Osborn and many of the people who worked on The Unsleeping Eye then made The Kingdom of Twilight.

== Cast ==
- David Wallace as Dick Holloway
- Wendy Osborne as Marjorie Challoner
- Charles Norman as John Challoner

== Reception ==
Reviews were generally poor.

== Sound version ==
In 1934 the film was converted into a sound version at Cinesound Productions in Australia. This was given some screenings in 1937.
