= Harry Southwell =

Australian actor

Harry Southwell (1882-1960) was an Australian actor, writer and film director best known for making films about Ned Kelly. He was born in Cardiff, Wales and spent a couple of years in America, where he adapted some short stories by O Henry into two reel films. He worked for Vitagraph in the United States for five years, then moved to Australia in 1919, where he used his experience as a screenwriter to impress investors to back him making features. He set up his own production company in Australia but few of his movies were commercially successful.

He returned to Europe in the 1920s, where he made a British-Belgian film called The Bells (1925), with himself in the lead role of Mathias the innkeeper. The film took five months to shoot. He later returned to Australia in 1931, where he worked for Australian Players. He made at least three Australian films about the famous outlaw Ned Kelly, and near the end of his career remade The Bells in 1935 as The Burgomeister.

== Feature films ==
- The Kelly Gang (1920)
- The Hordern Mystery (1920)
- When the Kellys Were Out (1923)
- David (1924)
- The Bells (aka Le juif polonais) (1925)
- The Seventh Commandment (1925)
- Down Under (1927)
- When the Kellys Rode (1934)
- The Burgomeister (1935), a remake of The Bells (1925)
- A Message to Kelly (1947) (abandoned)

=== Unmade projects ===
- The Sick Stockrider
