= Caught in the Net (1928 film) =

1928 film

- Directed by: Vaughan C. Marshall
- Written by: Sheila Preston
- Starring: Zillah Bateman; John Mayer
- Cinematography: Tasman Higgins
- Production company: Advance Films
- Release date: 14 July 1928
- Country: Australia
- Languages: Silent film English intertitles
- Budget: £2,000

Caught in the Net is a 1928 Australian silent film about a woman in high society starring Zillah Bateman, a British theatre star who was touring Australia at the time. Only part of the film survives.

== Plot ==
Society girl Phyllis Weston is loved by two men, handsome Jack Stacey and villainous Robson. In a yacht race, Robson tries to sabotage Jack's boat but fails. Robson then tries to get his sister to trap Jack in a comprising situation, but is unsuccessful.

The story includes a yacht race at St Kilda and a rescue from drowning at Portsea.

== Cast ==
- Zillah Bateman as Phyllis Weston
- John Mayer as Jack Stacey
- Charles Brown as Robson
- Peggy Farr
- Viva Vawden
- Felix St H Jellicoe
- Beverley Usher

== Production ==
Advance Films had held a competition to find best new Australian story.

The film was shot in early 1928 with exteriors filmed at Portsea.

== Release ==
The film was released as a supporting feature and also was screened in the UK as a quota film.

Everyone's reported that it had "fallen down at the box office."
