= Adrian Knox =

Australian politician and Chief Justice of the High Court (1863–1932)

The Right Honourable Sir Adrian Knox KCMG KC
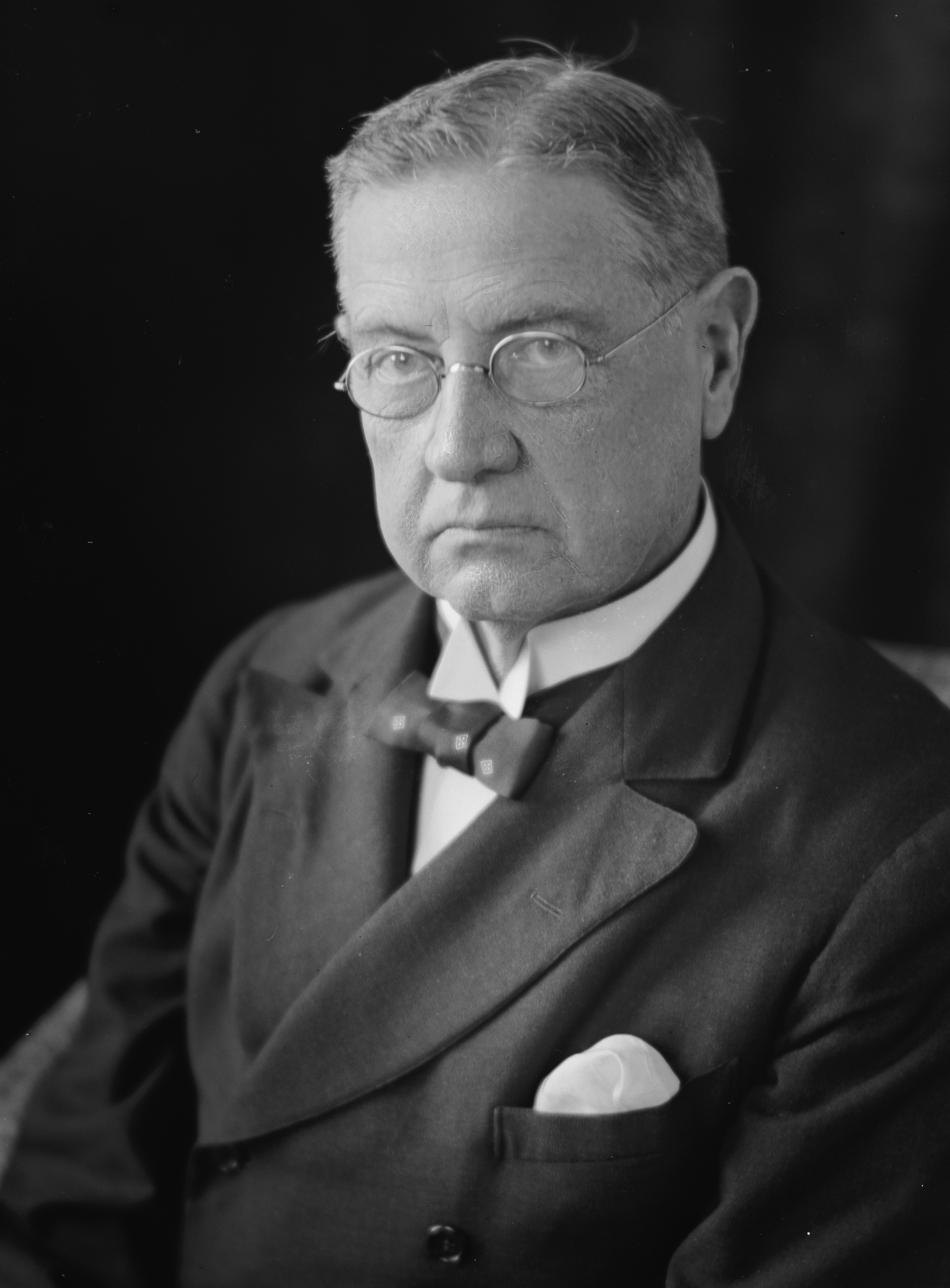
- Portrait of Sir Adrian Knox, November 1923

Chief Justice of Australia
- In office 18 October 1919 – 31 March 1930
- Nominated by: Billy Hughes
- Appointed by: Sir Ronald Munro Ferguson
- Preceded by: Sir Samuel Griffith
- Succeeded by: Sir Isaac Isaacs

Personal details
- Born: 29 November 1863 Sydney, New South Wales, Australia
- Died: 27 April 1932 (aged 69) Woollahra, New South Wales, Australia
- Spouse: Florence Lawson (m. 1897)
- Parent: Sir Edward Knox (father)

Sir Adrian Knox (29 November 1863 – 27 April 1932) was an Australian lawyer and judge who served as the second Chief Justice of Australia, in office from 1919 to 1930.

Knox was born in Sydney, the son of businessman Sir Edward Knox. He studied law at Trinity College, Cambridge, and after returning to Australia established a successful law firm. He was elected to the New South Wales Legislative Assembly in 1894, but retired in 1898 after just two terms in office. Knox eventually became one of the best known barristers in New South Wales, taking silk in 1906 and appearing frequently in major constitutional cases. In 1919, he was somewhat unexpectedly nominated by Billy Hughes to succeed the retiring Samuel Griffith as Chief Justice. The most famous decision of his tenure was the Engineers case of 1920.

== Early life ==
Knox was born in Sydney on 29 November 1863, the son of Sir Edward Knox and the former Martha Rutledge. His mother was born in Ireland, and was the sister of the Victorian politician William Rutledge. His father was born in England, and was the founder of the Colonial Sugar Refining Company. Knox attended private schools in Sydney and was then sent to England to complete his education. After a period at Harrow School, he went on to study law at Trinity College, Cambridge, graduating in 1885. Shortly after, he was admitted to the Inner Temple, allowing him to practise as a barrister.

== Legal career ==
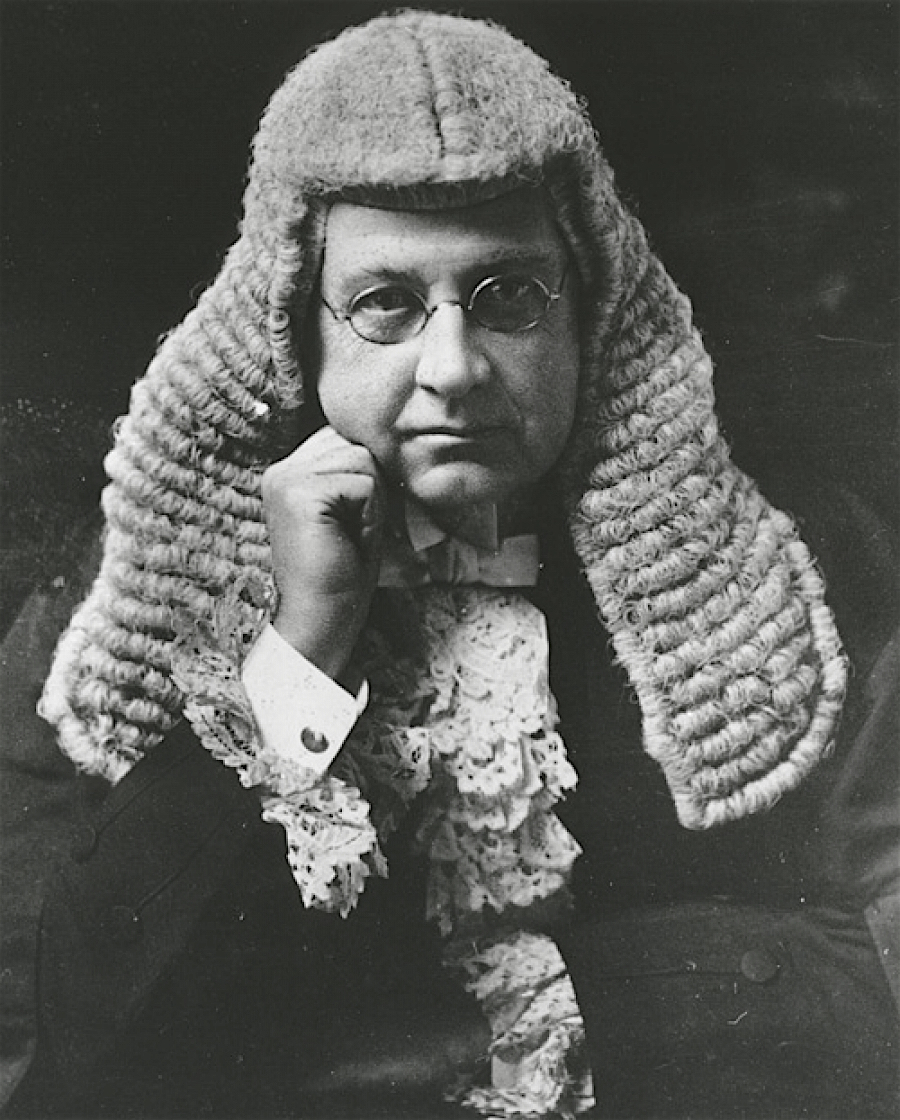
Adrian Knox

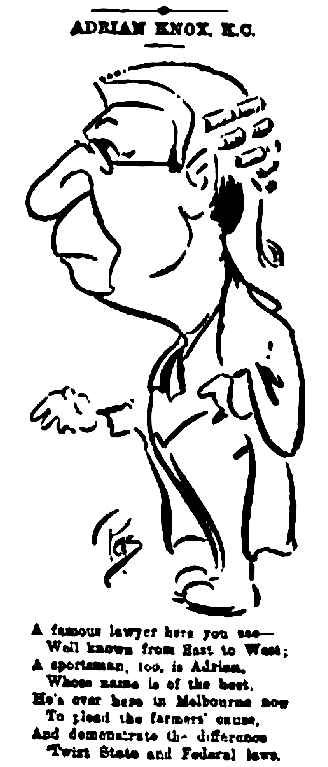
Knox caricatured in 1915

Knox returned to Australia in 1886 and joined his brother George in practising law. When George died in 1888, Adrian took over the practice, and soon became one of the most successful lawyers at the Sydney bar. Between 1888 and 1890, he reported equity cases for the New South Wales Law Reports.

Knox was elected to the New South Wales Legislative Assembly at the 1894 election for the seat of Woollahra. After being reelected at the 1895 election, he retired from the parliament in 1898, to concentrate on his legal career. At this time, he was also a director of the Australian Mutual Provident Society and a founding member of the Walter and Eliza Hall Trust.

Knox was made a King's Counsel in 1906, and shortly after was offered a position on the bench of the Supreme Court of New South Wales, which he declined. Also in 1906, Knox became Chairman of the Australian Jockey Club, indulging his passion for horse-racing. In 1910, Knox's horse "Vavasor" won the Sydney Cup. He remained chairman until 1919. During World War I, Knox left his practice and traveled to Egypt, where he served as a Commissioner for the Red Cross. He served on the NSW Bar Council from its foundation in 1902 until 1910, and again from 1916 to 1919.

== Judicial career ==
Soon after Knox returned from Egypt, Sir Samuel Griffith retired as the first Chief Justice of the High Court of Australia. In October 1919, Prime Minister Billy Hughes nominated Knox for appointment as the second. His appointment was received somewhat poorly by Sir Edmund Barton, who as the senior judge on the court and a former prime minister felt a certain entitlement to the position. Knox sat on a number of judicial committees in this capacity, including one which investigated the British Government's authority to establish the Boundary Commission for Northern Ireland. During his time as Chief Justice, Knox presided over such significant cases as the Engineers' case of 1920.

Knox was one of six justices of the High Court to have served in the Parliament of New South Wales, along with Edmund Barton, Richard O'Connor, Albert Piddington, Edward McTiernan and H. V. Evatt.

In 1930, Knox was left half of the estate of his friend and mining magnate John Brown, which was reportedly worth more than a million pounds, and in March 1930 he retired from the High Court in order to manage this business. Knox died in Woollahra on 27 April 1932 and is interred in Waverley Cemetery. He was survived by his wife and three children.

He was a book collector and his private library was considered one of the best in Sydney.

== Honours ==
In 1918, Knox was made a Companion of the Order of St Michael and St George (CMG), and in 1921 he was elevated to Knight Commander of that order (KCMG). He was appointed to the Privy Council of the United Kingdom in 1920, allowing him to use the style "The Right Honourable". Knox was an inaugural inductee of the Australian Racing Hall of Fame, which was established in 2001. The Adrian Knox Stakes is an AJC Group 3 Australian Thoroughbred quality handicap horse race named in honour of Knox which is held annually at Randwick Racecourse in Sydney in September

== Bibliography ==
- Serle, Percival (1949). "Knox, Adrian". Dictionary of Australian Biography. Sydney: Angus & Robertson.
- Australian Racing Hall of Fame – Sir Adrian Knox

Legal offices
Preceded by Sir Samuel Griffith	Chief Justice of Australia; 1919–1930	Succeeded by Sir Isaac Isaacs
New South Wales Legislative Assembly
New seat	Member for Woollahra; 1894–1898	Succeeded by John Garland
