= NSW Bookstall Company =

Former Australian publishing company

NSW Bookstall Company was a Sydney company which operated a chain of newsagencies throughout New South Wales. It was notable as a publisher of inexpensive paperback books which were written, illustrated, published and printed in Australia, and sold to commuters at bookstalls in railway stations and elsewhere in New South Wales.

== History ==
The company was founded as the Sydney Bookstall Company by Henry Lloyd (c. 1847 – 24 September 1897) of "Linden Hall", Annandale, New South Wales around 1880 as a newsagent. Its first foray into publishing may have been racebooks (form guides or programmes) for the Hawkesbury Race Club around 1886. Over its lifetime, the NSW Bookstall company published over 350 titles with over 1000 reprints, with total sales of over five million copies.

A. C. Rowlandson (15 June 1865 – 15 June 1922) joined as a tram ticket seller in 1883 and built a strong interest in the business, which he bought from Henry Lloyd's widow. The greatest part of the company's business consisted of retailing local, interstate and overseas periodicals, postcards (Neville Cayley produced a series) and stationery from its eight city shops and fifty-odd railway stall outlets, but was important as one of Australia's most successful book publishers and retailers of locally produced paperback books.

Considerable effort was put into the artwork of the paperbacks, both on their brightly colored covers and the illustrations within. Artists who contributed included J. Muir Auld, Percy Benison, L. H. Booth, Norman Carter, H. W. Cotton, John P. Davis, Ambrose Dyson, Will Dyson, Tom Ferry, A. J. Fischer (often "Fisher"), Harry Garlick, C. H. Hunt, Ben Jordan, Harry Julius, George W. Lambert, Fred Leist, Norman Lindsay, Lionel Lindsay Percy Lindsay, Ruby Lindsay, Vernon Lorimer, David Low, Hugh Maclean, Frank P. Mahony, Claude Marquet, R. H. Moppett, Charles Nuttall, G. C. Pearce, James Postlethwaite, L. L. Roush, James F. Scott, Sydney Ure Smith, D. H. Souter, Percy Spence, Martin Stainforth, Alf Vincent and Harry J. Weston.

The University of Sydney Library has 153 of the original artworks used in the NSW Bookstall Company's publications, including cover artworks and illustrations. The State Library of New South Wales holds the company records from 1909 to 1938.

On Rowlandson's death, Reg. Wynn (c. 1866 – 17 December 1925) took over as managing director, and W. A. Crew was circulation manager. The company erected a large building at the corner of Market Street and Castlereagh Street. Reg. Wynn was succeeded by Paul Dowling.

With the onset of World War II, imports of comic books was severely restricted, which opened the market, previously swamped by the U.S. and British houses, to anyone who could provide a quality product, and the NSW Bookstall Company was ideally placed to publish and distribute such work. Tony Rafty, Will Donald, Tom Hubble, Noel Cook and Terry Powis were among the more successful artists, and the partnership of Brodie Mack and writer Peter Amos (real name Archie E. Martin) produced some excellent work for the NSW Bookstall Company. By 1949, the opportunity provided by wartime shortages no longer applied, and Australia was once again flooded with excess overseas production. Between 1957 and early 1958 the company's assets were sold.

== Titles ==
This list of titles of the range of NSW Bookstall titles, which is commonly referred as The Bookstall Series, is representative but not exhaustive.

- J. H. M. Abbott: Ensign Calder

Sally: The Tale of a Currency Lass
The Sign of the Serpent

- Arthur H. Adams: Double-Bed Dialogues

The Knight of the Motor Launch
The New Chum & four other stories

- Malcolm Afford: Owl of Darkness
- F. Agar: Eros! Eros Wins!
- Bob Allen: The Mare with the Silver Hoof
- Gerald R. Baldwin: In Racing Silk

Lydia's Lovers (Note: Ill. Percy Benison)

- Vera Barker: Equality Road

When Satan Laughs

- J. A. Barry: The Luck of the Native Born

South Seas Shipmates
Steve Brown's Bunyip

- A. Bathgate: Sodger Sandy's Bairn
- Louis Becke: The Adventures of Louis Bleke

Bully Hayes, Buccaneer

- Randolph Bedford: Aladdin and the Boss Cockie

Billy Pagan, Mining Engineer
Silver Star

- George W. Bell: The Little Giants of the East
- Francis E. Birtles (illus. by author): Lonely Lands
- H. K. Bloxham: The Double Abduction

On the Fringe of the Never Never

- Lancelot Booth: The Devil's Nightcap

Tools of Satan

- E. J. Brady: Tom Pagdin, Pirate
- Hilda M. Bridges: The Squatters' Daughter

The Lady of the Cavern

- Roy Bridges: The Barb of an Arrow

By His Excellency's Command
By Mountain Tracks
Cards of Fortune
The Fenceless Ranges
Haunts of Fear
On His Majesty's Service
Mr. Barrington
Mystery of the Cliff
The Stony Heights

- John X. Cameron: The Spell of the Bush
- R. J. Cassidy: Chandler of Corralinga
- Charles Chauvel: Uncivilised
- E. F. Christie: The Calling Voice
- George Cockerill: The Convict Pugilist
- Dale Collins: Stolen or Strayed
- Arthur Crocker: The Dingo Pup

The Great Turos Mystery
South Sea Sinners

- Paul Cupid: (Note: Perhaps A. C. Rowlandson himself) The Rival Physicians
- George Darrell: The Belle of the Bush
- Aiden de Bruno: The Carson Loan Mystery
- Don Delaney: The Captain of the Gang

For Turon Gold
Gentleman Jack
A Rebel of the Bush
The White Champion

- Will Donald: Heel Hitler
- Con Drew: The Doings of Dave

Jinker
Rogues and Ruses

- Edward Dyson: Benno and Some of the Push

Fact'ry 'ands
The Grey Goose Comedy Co.
In the Roaring Fifties
Loves of Lancelot
The Missing Link
Spats' Factory
Tommy the Hawker and Snifter his Boy

- A. R. Falk: Puppets of Chance

Red Star

- J. D. Fitzgerald: Children of the Sunlight
- Mabel Forrest: A Bachelor's Wife
- The Poems of Adam Lindsay Gordon
- Beatrice Grimshaw: The Coral Queen

White Savage Simon
Queen Vaiti

- Kate Harriott: Invalid and Convalescent Cookery
- W. G. Henderson: The Bathers
- Bert James: The Loser Pays

The Mystery of the Boxing Contest

- A. E. Jobson: The Adventures of Russell Howard
- Cecil Ross Johnston: The Trader
- Robert Kaleski: Australian Barkers and Biters
- A. R. Kent: A Chinese Vengeance
- Norman Lindsay: A Curate in Bohemia

Norman Lindsay's Book

- Sumner Locke: Brownie Unlimited

The Dawsons' Uncle George
Mum Dawson — Boss
Skeeter Farm

- David Low: The Billy Book
- H. R. McDuffie: Rooks and Crooks
- Claude McKay and Harry Julius Theatrical Caricatures
- John D. Fitzgerald: Greater Sydney and Greater Newcastle
- Jack McLaren: Feathers of Heaven

Fringe of the Law
The Oil Seekers
Fagaloa's Daughter
Red Mountain
The Savagery of Margaret Nestor
The Skipper of The Roaring Meg
Spear-Eye
Sunlight, Adventure and Love
Talifa

- A. Ian Macleod: Hack's Brat
- A. E. Martin: The Romance of Nomenclature, (1943) containing 1,250 Place Names in South Australia, West Australia and the Northern Territory
- Clarence W. Martin: Ubique
- Harold Mercer: Amazon Island
- Edward Meryon: At Hollands' Tank

One False Step
Yellow Silver

- William Monckton: Three Years with Thunderbolt
- Jack North: (Note: "Jack North" was the pseudonym of a Sydney journalist identified as Percy Reay, who earlier won a Bulletin contest for his story "Lure of the Bush" which was made into a film starring Snowy Baker. Reay and Franklyn Barrett wrote "The Adventures of Barry Lupino Detective" in 1919. Shortly after 1922 he moved to Brisbane, where he used the pseudonym for an article on punctuation.) The Black Opal

Harry Dale's Grand National
A Son of the Bush

- Ernest O'Ferrall: Bolger and the Boarders
- Ernest Osborne: The Copra Trader

Creatures of Impulse
The Plantation Manager

- Harrison Owen: The Mount Marunga Mystery
- Vance Palmer: The Boss of Killara

The Shantykeeper's Daughter

- Sydney Partrige: Rocky Section
- Sydney Partrige and Cecil Raworth: The Mystery of Wall's Hill
- S. W. Powell: The Closed Lagoon

A Golden Chance
The Great Jude Seal
Hermit Island
The Maker of Pearls
A Mantle of Authority
The Pearls of Cheong Tah
The Trader of Kameko
X-Mixture

- Ambrose Pratt: Dan Kelly – Outlaw

The Golden Kangaroo
The Outlaws of Weddin Range
Three Years with Thunderbolt
Wolaroi's Cup

- Clement Pratt: Caloola
- "Rata" (Thomas Richard Roydhouse): The Coloured Conquest
- Broda Reynolds: Dawn Asper

The Heart of the Bush
The Selector Girl

- Charles Rodda: Cerise and Gold

The Fortunes of Geoffrey Mayne

- Ivan Archer Rosenblum: Marjorie of Blue Lake

Stella Sothern

- Steele Rudd: Back at Our Selection

The Book of Dan
Dad in Politics
The Dashwoods
Duncan McClure
For Life
Grandpa's Selection
Kayton's Selection
Memoirs of Corporal Keeley
On an Australian Farm
On Our Selection
Our New Selection
The Old Homestead
The Poor Parson
Sandy's Selection
From Selection to City
Stocking Our Selection

- W. Sabelburg: The Key of the Mystery
- John Sandes: Love and the Aeroplane
- Charles E. Sayers: The Jumping Double
- H. M. Somer: Base Brands
- Edward S. Sorenson: Murty Brown

Mystery of Murrawang
The Rheas of Werriwang
The Squatter's Ward

- Thomas E. Spencer: Bindawalla

Budgeree Ballads
The Haunted Shanty
How McDougall Topped the Score, and other Verses and Sketches;
The Spring Cleaning
The Surprising Adventures of Bridget McSweeney
That Droll Lady
Why Doherty Died

- A. G. Stephens (ed.) Aboriginalities (from The Bulletin)

Bill's Idées
The Bulletin Book of Humorous Verses and Recitations
The Bulletin Reciter
Gum Blossoms: A Volume of Australian Verse

- Crystal Stirling: Soldiers Two
- Ralph Stock: The Pyjama Man

The Recipe for Rubber

- R. S. Tait: Scotty Mac, Shearer
- Taylor: Campaign Cartoons
- Harry Tighe: The Man of Sympathy
- Robert Waldron: The Flying Doctor

Pearl Shell

- J. M. Walsh: Goldie Law

Tap Tap Island

- Charles D. Websdale (J. Muir Auld ill.): Seafarers
- Charles White: Ben Hall

Captain Moonlite
Gardiner, King of the Road
John Vane, Bushranger
The Kelly Gang
Martin Cash
Short-lived Bushrangers

- Arthur Wright: The Boss o' Yedden

The Boy from Bullarah
The Breed Holds Good
A Close Call
A Colt from the Country
Fettered by Fate
Gambler's Gold
A Game of Chance
A Good Recovery
The Hate of a Hun
In the Last Stride
Keane of Kalgoorlie
A Rogue's Luck
A Rough Passage
The Outlaw's Daughter
Over the Odds
Rung In
A Sport from Hollowlog Flat
The Squatter's Secret
Under a Cloud
When Nuggets Glistened

- Claude P. Wynn: Princess Naldi's Fetish
- (none named): Australian Bungalow and Cottage Home Designs
- (none named): Canberra Cookery Book
- (none named): Guide to the City of Sydney and the Pleasure Resorts of New South Wales
- (none named): The Harbour Guide
- (none named): Panoramic Sydney
- (none named): Sydney from the Air
