= 1922 in Australian literature =

This article presents a list of the historical events and publications of Australian literature during 1922.

== Books ==
- Hilda Bridges — The Squatter's Daughter
- Mary Grant Bruce — The Stone Axe of Burkamukk
- Bernard Cronin — Bluff Stakes
- Jean Curlewis — Drowning Maze
- Dulcie Deamer — The Street of the Gazelle
- Edward Dyson — The Grey Goose Comedy Company
- Havelock Ellis — Kanga Creek: An Australian Idyll
- Mary Gilmore — The Hound of the Road
- Nat Gould
  - A Dangerous Stable
  - Racing Rivals
- Vance Palmer — The Boss of Killara
- Steele Rudd — On Emu Creek
- Arthur Wright – The Boss o' Yedden

== Poetry ==
- E. J. Brady — "The Coachman's Yarn"
- C. J. Dennis — "Woolloomooloo"
- Mabel Forrest
  - "Kassaptu: (The Assyrian Witch)"
  - Streets and Gardens
- Lesbia Harford — "The Psychological Craze"
- Henry Lawson — "On the Night Train"
- Hugh McCrae — "The Watchers"
- John Shaw Neilson — "Schoolgirls Hastening"
- Will H. Ogilvie — Galloping Shoes: Verses
- Kenneth Slessor
  - "Nuremberg"
  - "Pan at Lane Cove"

== Children's and Young Adult fiction ==
- Myra Morris — Us Five
- Ethel Turner — Jennifer, J.
- Lilian Turner — Peggy the Pilot

== Short stories ==
- Edward Dyson — "The Accursed Thing"
- Mary Gilmore — "On the Track to Braidwood"
- Vance Palmer — "The Black Mare"

== Drama ==
- C. J. Dennis & Bert Bailey — The Sentimental Bloke
- Louis Esson — The Battler

== Non-fiction ==
- Alec H. Chisholm — Mateship with Birds
- Mary Gaunt — Where the Twain Meet

== Births ==
A list, ordered by date of birth (and, if the date is either unspecified or repeated, ordered alphabetically by surname) of births in 1922 of Australian literary figures, authors of written works or literature-related individuals follows, including year of death.

- 10 May — Ric Throssell, diplomat and author whose writings included novels, plays, film and television scripts and memoirs (died 1999)
- 10 June — Peter Pinney, novelist and travel writer (died 1992)
- 2 August — Geoffrey Dutton, poet (died 1998)
- 28 August — Jacob C. Rosenberg, poet and novelist (born in Poland) (died 2008)
- 9 September — Stephen Murray-Smith, writer, editor and educator (died 1988)

Unknown date

- Peter Bladen, poet (died 2001)

== Deaths ==
A list, ordered by date of death (and, if the date is either unspecified or repeated, ordered alphabetically by surname) of deaths in 1922 of Australian literary figures, authors of written works or literature-related individuals follows, including year of birth.

- 14 February — Bertram Stevens, editor and critic (born 1872)
- 25 August – Edward George Honey, journalist (born 1885)
- 2 September — Henry Lawson, poet and short story writer (born 1867)

== See also ==
- 1922 in Australia
- 1922 in literature
- 1922 in poetry
- List of years in Australian literature
- List of years in literature
