= 1916 in Australian literature =

This article presents a list of the historical events and publications of Australian literature during 1916.

== Events ==
- The School Magazine is first published by the New South Wales Department of Education

== Books ==
- Sumner Locke – Samaritan Mary
- Rosa Praed – Sister Sorrow: A Story of Australian Life
- Katharine Susannah Prichard – Windlestraws
- Arthur Wright
  - The Hate of a Hun
  - Under a Cloud

== Short stories ==
- Mary Gaunt – The Ends of the Earth: Stories
- Steele Rudd – Grandpa's Selection: And Other Stories

== Children's and Young Adult fiction ==
- Mary Grant Bruce – Jim and Wally
- Ethel Turner – John of Daunt

== Poetry ==
- Christopher Brennan – "Irish to English: April 26, 1916"
- C. J. Dennis – The Moods of Ginger Mick
- Joseph Furphy and Kate Baker editor – The Poems of Joseph Furphy
- Leon Gellert
  - "Anzac Cove"
  - "The Last to Leave"
- Henry Lawson – "Black Bonnets"
- Will H. Ogilvie – The Australian and Other Verses

== Biography ==
- Douglas Sladen – From Boundary-Rider to Prime Minister: Hughes of Australia, The Man of the Hour

== Births ==
A list, ordered by date of birth (and, if the date is either unspecified or repeated, ordered alphabetically by surname) of births in 1916 of Australian literary figures, authors of written works or literature-related individuals follows, including year of death.

- 26 January – Justina Williams, poet (died 2008)
- 26 April – Morris West, novelist (died 1999)
- 9 May – Helen Haenke, poet, playwright and artist (died 1978)
- 25 July – Barbara Vernon, playwright, screenwriter and radio announcer (died 1978)
- 1 August – Val Vallis, poet (died 2009)
- 25 September – Jessica Anderson, novelist (died 2010)
- 8 October – George Turner, novelist and critic (died 1997)
- 1 November – Elisabeth MacIntyre, writer for children (died 2004)
- 14 December – Harold Stewart, poet and oriental scholar (died 1995)

== Deaths ==
A list, ordered by date of death (and, if the date is either unspecified or repeated, ordered alphabetically by surname) of deaths in 1916 of Australian literary figures, authors of written works or literature-related individuals follows, including year of birth.

- 2 October – William Little, poet and politician (born 1839)

Unknown date:

- April – Frank Hutchinson, poet (born ca 1836)

== See also ==
- 1916 in Australia
- 1916 in literature
- 1916 in poetry
- List of years in Australian literature
- List of years in literature
