= Golden West =

Golden West may refer to:

== Places ==
- Rural Municipality of Golden West No. 95, Saskatchewan, Canada

== Transportation ==
- Golden West Airlines, a defunct airline
- Golden West (clipper), an 1852 clipper ship in the California trade

== Companies ==
- Golden West Broadcasters, a broadcasting company owned by Gene Autry
- Golden West Broadcasting, a Canadian radio broadcasting company
- Golden West Financial, a financial institution

== Other ==
- Golden West College, a community college in Huntington Beach, California
- Golden West Network, the Seven Network affiliate in Western Australia
- The Golden West (1911 film), an Australian film
- The Golden West (1932 film), an American Western film
- Native Sons of the Golden West, a charitable organization which promotes California history
- The Girl of the Golden West (disambiguation)
