= 1912 in Australian literature =

This article presents a list of the historical events and publications of Australian literature during 1912.

== Books ==
- James Francis Dwyer — The White Waterfall
- Gertrude Hart — The Dream Girl
- Fergus Hume
  - The Mystery Queen
  - A Son of Perdition: An Occult Romance
- Dorothea Mackellar & Ruth M. Bedford — The Little Blue Devil
- Steele Rudd — The Old Homestead
- Lindsay Russell
  - Love Letters of a Priest
  - Smouldering Fires
- Thomas Edward Spencer — Bindawalla: An Australian Story
- Arthur Wright – Rung In

== Children's and young adults ==
- Mary Grant Bruce — Timothy in Bushland
- May Gibbs — About Us

== Short stories ==
- Henry Lawson — "Ah Soon"
- Lilian Turner — Written Down

== Poetry ==
- Louis Esson — Red Gums and Other Verses
- G. Herbert Gibson — Ironbark Splinters from the Australian Bush
- Adam Lindsay Gordon — The Poems of Adam Lindsay Gordon
- Sydney Jephcott — Penetralia
- Norman Lindsay — Norman Lindsay's Book: No. I
- John Shaw Neilson
  - "Honeythirst"
  - "The Lover Sings"
  - "The Petticoat Plays"
- C. H. Souter — Irish Lords and Other Verses

== Drama ==
- Louis Esson – The Time is Not Yet Ripe

== Non-Fiction ==
- Ethel Turner — Ports and Happy Havens

== Births ==
A list, ordered by date of birth (and, if the date is either unspecified or repeated, ordered alphabetically by surname) of births in 1912 of Australian literary figures, authors of written works or literature-related individuals follows, including year of death.

- 12 March — Kylie Tennant, novelist (died 1988)
- 28 March — A. Bertram Chandler, science fiction writer (died 1984)
- 2 April — Barbara Giles, poet (died 2006)
- 15 May — Margaret Diesendorf, linguist, poet, editor, translator and educationist (died 1993)
- 28 May — Patrick White, novelist (died 1990)
- 12 June — Roland Robinson, poet (died 1992)
- 25 June — Gordon Neil Stewart, writer (died 1999)
- 20 July — George Johnston, novelist (died 1970)
- 16 September — John Jefferson Bray, poet (died 1995)
- 9 October — Elizabeth Kata, writer whose real name was Elizabeth Katayama (died 1998)

== Deaths ==
A list, ordered by date of death (and, if the date is either unspecified or repeated, ordered alphabetically by surname) of deaths in 1912 of Australian literary figures, authors of written works or literature-related individuals follows, including year of birth.

- 5 April — Robert Dudley Adams, poet (born 1829)
- 13 September — Joseph Furphy, novelist (born 1843)

== See also ==
- 1912 in Australia
- 1912 in literature
- 1912 in poetry
- List of years in Australian literature
- List of years in literature
