= A Game of Chance =

1920 novel

- Title page for A Game of Chance (1922)
- Author: Arthur Wright
- Language: English
- Series: Bookstall series
- Genre: Sporting
- Publisher: NSW Bookstall Company
- Publication date: 1920
- Publication place: Australia

A Game of Chance is a 1920 sporting novel by Arthur Wright, about sensational events in the world of Australian horse racing.

== Reception ==
According to the reviewer in the Western Mail:

Hero and heroine and villain of the piece are well enough drawn; and there is incident enough in the book to satisfy the veriest glutton for sensation; while towards the close of an exciting story the murder trial... finishes in a most unexpected manner. Mr. Arthur Wright has been compared with the late Nat Gould; and as a rule, his books contain even greater dramatic, or melodramatic, possibilities, or impossibilities, than the numerous works of that most prolific writer.
