= The Octoroon (1912 film) =

- Directed by: George Young
- Based on: play by Dion Boucicault
- Production company: Australian Film Syndicate
- Release date: 14 June 1911 (preview)
- Running time: over 3,000 feet
- Country: Australia
- Languages: Silent film English intertitles

The Octoroon is an Australian film directed by George Young based on a popular play by Dion Boucicault which had recently enjoyed a popular run in Australia. It is considered a lost film.

== Synopsis ==
In the deep south of 1850s USA, an octoroon is given her freedom by her white father but is later bought as a slave by the evil Jacob McCloskey.

- Plantatlon of Terrobonne
- The Free Papers of Zoe Stolen
- Murder of Paul and Theft of the Mail Bags
- The Great Slave Sale
- M'Cloakey Buys Zoe
- The Murder Discovered
- The Ship Is Fired
- The Red Man's Vengeance
- The Knife Fight
- Death of M'Closkey
- Zoe Takes Poison
- To the Rescue
- Too Late! Too Late!!
- Death Defore Dishonour.

== Production ==
It was an early film from the Australian Film Syndicate. According to articles from the time, other films made from this company included The Shadow of the Rockies, Black Talbot and The Diamond Cross.

The film was shot in Sydney with an old paddle steamer, Narrabeen, standing in for a Mississippi river boat.

== Significance ==
The writer Bruce Dennett has commented on the selection of this material to make an Australian film. "The identifiable influence of Southern stories and characters at such an early stage in the history of Australian film is hard to ignore. The Octoroon is especially notable because it deals with questions of race and blood, issues that were important and enduring social and historical preoccupations of the young Australian nation, as they continued to be for the United States."
