= The Boy from Bullarah =

Book by Arthur Wright

- Author: Arthur Wright
- Illustrator: Percy Lindsay
- Language: English
- Genre: Sporting
- Publisher: States Publishing
- Publication date: 1925
- Publication place: Australia
- Pages: 190

The Boy from Bullarah is a 1925 novel by Australian sporting novelist Arthur Wright.

"Finesse, fine writing, characterisation, have no place among the means Mr. Wright employs", said the West Australian.

== Plot ==
Boxer Terry Truval wants to make it in the big city, Sydney. Dan Jay, filmmaker, tries to turn him into a film star.
