= Alfred Cecil Rowlandson =

Australian publisher

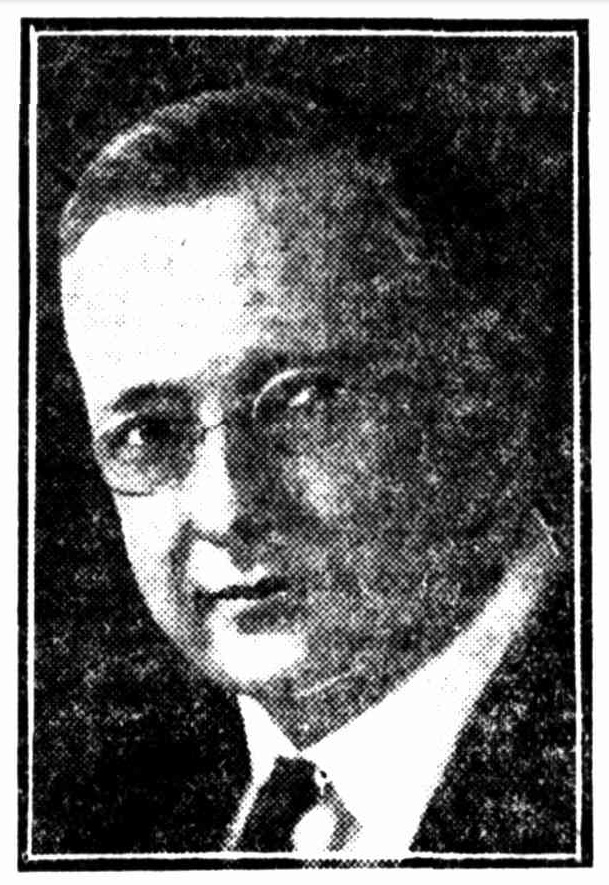
- Born: 15 June 1865; Daylesford, Victoria
- Died: 15 June 1922 (aged 57); Wellington, New Zealand
- Occupations: Publisher and bookseller

Alfred Cecil Rowlandson (15 June 1865 – 15 June 1922), generally referred to as A. C. Rowlandson, was an Australian publisher and bookseller.

== Early life ==
Rowlandson was born on 15 June 1865 at Daylesford, Victoria, the second surviving son of Arthur Hodgson Rowlandson, an Indian-born gold-miner, and his wife Susan Sophia (née Black), born in Brechin, Scotland. In 1878 the Rowlandson family moved to Sydney, where young Rowlandson was employed as an office boy in the office of Henry Waddington, of Macquarie Place.

== Career ==
Rowlandson and Alma Jenkins were married in 1898 in Sydney.

In late 1904 the NSW Bookstall Company published Steele Rudd's Sandy's Selection, for which Rowlandson paid £500 for the publication rights, at that time the largest sum paid in advance for an Australian book. He published works by Arthur Adams, John Barry, Louis Becke, Randolph Bedford, Edwin Brady, George Cockerill, Edward Dyson, Beatrice Grimshaw, Sumner Locke, Vance Palmer, Ambrose Pratt, Thomas Spencer and Alfred Stephens among others. Postcards included paintings by Neville Cayley. Rowlandson himself may have been the author (as 'Paul Cupid') of a 1909 novel The Rival Physicians.

== Late life and legacy ==
Rowlandson had to work to manage business which worked on a small profit margin. By 1922 it was reported that "for some time" Rowlandson's "health had been unsatisfactory".

In April 1922 Rowlandson, accompanied by his wife and three children, left Sydney on a voyage to North America for the sake of his health. However, when he arrived at San Francisco Rowlandson was too ill to land. On the return journey to Australia, when the vessel arrived at Wellington, New Zealand, he was removed to a private hospital to be operated on for appendicitis. After the operation Rowlandson was reported to have rallied, but diabetic complications set in and he died on 15 June 1922, aged 57 years.

Rowlandson was buried in Gore Hill Cemetery, Sydney, leaving a widow, son, daughter and an adopted daughter.

== See also ==
- NSW Bookstall Company
