= The Roaring Days of Sixty Eight =

- Production company: Australian Film Company
- Release date: 11 January 1912
- Running time: 4,000 feet
- Country: Australia
- Language: English

The Roaring Days of Sixty Eight is a 1912 Australian film set during the Australian gold rush.

It is presumed to be a lost film.

The film was reported as being in "active preparation" in December 1911. It appears to have been released in January 1911.

Its length has been given as 4000 feet, 3,500 feet or 3,000 feet.

== Synopsis ==
- Out in Australia
- The Great Bank Robbery
- Goulder Sentenced to the Prison Hulks
- The Convict's Revolt
- Sensational Fight with the Warders
