= Fettered by Fate =

Novel by Arthur Wright

- Author: Arthur Wright
- Illustrator: Percy Lindsay
- Language: English
- Series: Bookstall series
- Publisher: NSW Bookstall Company
- Publication date: 1921
- Publication place: Australia
- Pages: 187

Fettered by Fate is a mystery novel by Australian sporting novelist Arthur Wright, a murder story with a horse-racing backdrop, published in 1921.

== Reception ==
According to The Queenslander "it is one of the best of Arthur Wright's books, and though Mr. Wright runs dangerously close to an anachronism in associating a survivor of a bushranging gang with modern motor cars that will not concern the reader who is looking for excitement." Another reviewer said "in its 22 chapters there is not a dull moment for the story moves rapidly and each page is crowned with incident."
