= Under a Cloud =

Under a Cloud may refer to:

- Under a Cloud (film), 1937 British comedy film directed by George King
- Under a Cloud (novel), 1916 book by Arthur Wright
- "Under a Cloud", song from Quasi album Field Studies
