= Roy Bridges (author) =

Australian journalist and novelist

- Born: Royal Tasman Bridges; 23 March 1885; Hobart, Tasmania, Australia
- Died: 14 March 1952 (aged 66); Sorell, Tasmania, Australia
- Education: University of Tasmania
- Occupation: Writer
- Relatives: Hilda Bridges (sister)

Royal Tasman Bridges (23 March 1885 – 14 March 1952) was an Australian author. He has been described as "Tasmania's most prolific novelist".

Bridges was born in Hobart, Tasmania. He graduated from the University of Tasmania and subsequently worked as a journalist with the Tasmanian News, The Mercury, The Australian Star, and The Age (including as chief parliamentary reporter. He published his first novel, The Barb of an Arrow, in 1909 and wrote prolifically for the rest of his life, completing 36 novels on a variety of themes. Many of Bridges' works were cheap, quickly written paperbacks published by the NSW Bookstall Company. His more "mature" works have been classed within the Tasmanian Gothic genre. According to his biographer Anne-Marie Condé, he is "remembered mainly by enthusiasts interested in the literary culture of Tasmania".

From 1930 until his death in 1952, Bridges lived with his sister Hilda Bridges – also a novelist – at their mother's family home Wood's Farm outside of Sorell. He was a close friend of Phillip Schuler, a fellow journalist who was killed in World War I. He had close relationships with other men and may have been gay.

== Bibliography ==
=== Novels ===
- The Barb of an Arrow (1909)
- By His Excellency's Command (1910)
- Mr. Barrington (1911)
- The Fugitive (1914)
- On His Majesty's Service : A Tale of Van Dieman's Land (1914)
- The Bubble Moon (1915)
- The Fires of Hate (1915)
- Merchandise : A Novel (1918)
- The Fenceless Ranges (1920)
- The Vats of Tyre (1921)
- The Cards of Fortune (1922)
- Rogue's Haven (1922)
- Green Butterflies (1923)
- By Mountain Tracks (1924)
- Rats' Castle (1924)
- Gates of Birth (1926)
- A Mirror of Silver (1927)
- Through Another Gate (1927)
- Legion : For We Are Many (1928)
- Negrohead (1929)
- And All That Beauty (1929)
- Trinity (1931)
- These Were Thy Merchants (1932)
- Soul From the Sword (1932)
- Cloud (1932)
- The House of Fendon (1936)
- Sullivan's Bay (1937)
- The Alden Case (1937)
- This House is Haunted (1939)
- Old Admiral Death (1940)
- The Owl is Abroad (1941)
- The Case for Mrs Heydon (1945)
- The League of the Lord (1950)

=== Children's fiction ===
- Dead Man's Gold (1916)
- The Black House (1920)

=== Collection ===
- The Immortal Dawn (1917) — war literature, prose, short stories

=== Non-fiction ===
- From Silver to Steel : The Romance of Broken Hill Proprietary (1920)
- One Hundred Years : The Romance of the Victorian People (1934)
- That Yesterday was Home (1948) — autobiography
