= Neville Cayley =

Neville Cayley may refer to:

- Neville Henry Cayley (1853–1903), Australian bird artist
- Neville William Cayley (1886–1950), son of the above, Australian ornithologist and bird artist
