= George Young (filmmaker) =

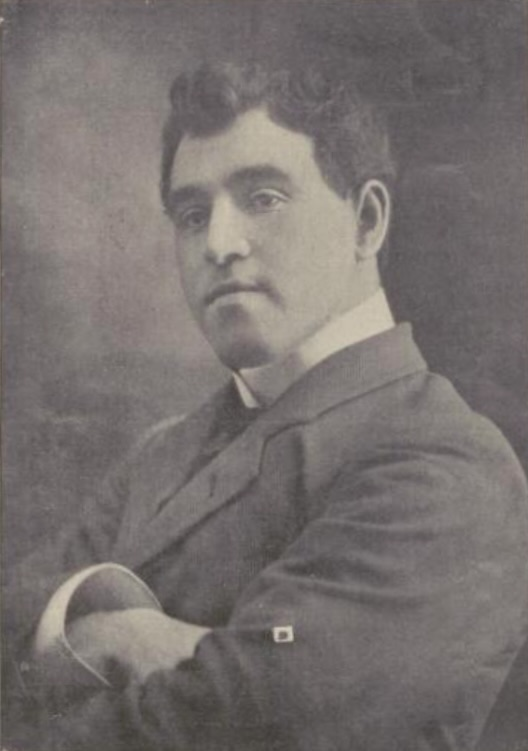
George Young in 1905

George Young was an Australian stage manager and film director who worked in the silent era. He went into film after a career working for J.C. Williamson Ltd, making a number of movies for the Australian Film Syndicate. He was the brother of opera star Florence Young.

== Filmography ==
- The Golden West (1911)
- Three Strings to Her Bow (1911)
- The Octoroon (1912)
- Strike (1912)
- Gambler's Gold (1912)
