= Black Talbot =

- Based on: Black Talbot by Arthur Wright
- Production company: Australian Film Syndicate
- Release date: 11 August 1911
- Running time: over 3,000 feet.
- Country: Australia
- Language: English

Black Talbot is a 1911 Australian film from the Australian Film Syndicate who also made The Octoroon. It is a lost film.

It was based on a 1910 story by Arthur Wright about the fictitious bushranger Black Talbot.

It was screened in August 1911 for an orphanage. The film was screening in cinemas in 1912.
