= The Australian and Other Verses =

1916 poetry collection by Will H. Ogilvie

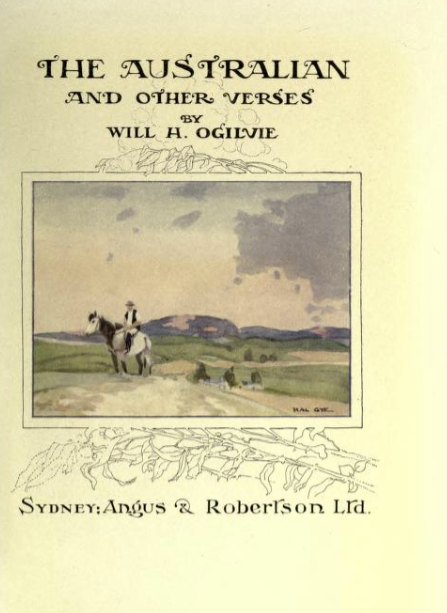
- Title page for The Australian and Other Verses (1916)
- Author: Will H. Ogilvie
- Language: English
- Genre: Poetry collection
- Publisher: Angus and Robertson
- Publication date: 1916
- Publication place: Australia
- Media type: Print
- Pages: 174 pp
- Preceded by: Gray Horses
- Followed by: Galloping Shoes: Hunting and Polo Poems

The Australian and Other Verses is a collection of poetry by the Scottish-Australian writer Will H. Ogilvie, published by Angus and Robertson, in 1916. The collection includes two illustrated plates by Hal Gye.

The collection consists of 81 poems from a variety of sources. The first edition notes: "The verses from which this volume takes its title — The Australian — first appeared in London Punch. Other pieces have appeared in the Spectator, Bulletin, Lone Hand, Pall Mall Magazine, Glasgow Herald, Westminster Gazette, British Australasian and Scotsman. My thanks are due to the Proprietors for permission to reprint."

== Dedication ==
- "To THE MEN OF AUSTRALIA, who have proved for all time their unconquerable spirit and unswerving loyalty to the right, I dedicate these songs of the misty land they fought for and the sunny land that bred them"

== Contents ==
- "The Australian"
- "Sunny Country"
- "The Bushmen"
- "The Overlander"
- "The Riding Camel"
- "A Leaf from Macquarie"
- "My Australian Spurs"
- "The Outlaw"
- "The Pack Horse"
- "The White Ibis"
- "Cicadas"
- "Sydney"
- "A Bush Night"
- "The Australian Fleet"
- "Black Wings"
- "The Team Bullock"
- "Black Trackers"
- "Coo-ee"
- "Comrades"
- "The Bush"
- "Steeds of the Mist"
- "The Whaup"
- "The Ingleside"
- "The Horseman"
- "The Signpost"
- "A Song of the Poets"
- "The Gipsy"
- "The Flying Scotsman"
- "Last Night"
- "The Carpet of the Wind"
- "Celandine"
- "Laughter"
- "Again"
- "By Candle-Light"
- "The Garden of Night"
- "The Mushroom Gatherers"
- "The Border Harp"
- "A Little Bit of Garden"
- "A Farewell"
- "There's a Clean Wind Blowing"
- "Sheep Country"
- "The Plough"
- "The Comfort of the Hills"
- "The Roman Wall"
- "The Shadow Dancers"
- "Flowers of the Frost"
- "Contentment"
- "Riches"
- "The Brown Men"
- "A Maker of Empire"
- "A Summer Evening"
- "The Happy People"
- "A Lullaby"
- "The Admiral"
- "The Bringer of Days"
- "Three"
- "Baby's Trumpet"
- "The Grey Nurse"
- "The Burning of Summer"
- "A Song of Rain"
- "The Bundle in the Shawl"
- "To My Baby Girl"
- "In the Woods"
- "The Witches' Steeds"
- "The Barring of the Gates"
- "The Storks"
- "A Dream of England"
- "War"
- "A Song of the Old Men"
- "The Stragglers"
- "The Channel Guard"
- "A Begging Song for Belgium"
- "The Unawakened Hills"
- "The Ladies from Hell"
- "O Weeping Glens"
- "The Scots Greys"
- "The Colours"
- "Remounts"
- "The Heroes"
- "Sails of Victory"
- "A Song of the Flag"

== Critical reception ==
A writer in The Daily Telegraph (Sydney) noted: "Many Australians who admire Will Oglivie's lilting ballads of the fair girls and brave horses of the bush will be glad to have another volume from him. The Australian and Other Verses contains a number of tributes to the bushman and the horse, besides some tender poems of children and some stirring lines evoked by the war. The best of the war verses is that which gives its name to the book."

The reviewer of the collection in The Sydney Morning Herald admired the book: "Not all the contents of The Australian, Mr. Will Ogilvie's latest volume of poems, are new. Some of the best verses, such as 'The Riding Camel,' 'The Team Bullock,' and 'The Outlaw,' were published in a collection that appeared three or four years ago. Of the rest the most effective are those inspired by the war. Mr. Ogilvie's Scottish ancestry and his Australian associations make him single out for special attention the Highlanders and the Anzacs, and he celebrates their martial exploits in stirring, spirited strains, which, if they are not perhaps the rarified essence of poetry, are, at any rate, excellent verse."

== Publication history ==
After the initial publication of the collection by Angus and Robertson in 1916, it was reissued as follows:

- Angus and Robertson, Trench edition, 1916
- Angus and Robertson, 1982 and 2018

== Note ==
- The full text of the poetry collection is available at the Internet Archive.

== See also ==
- 1916 in Australian literature
