= Over the Odds (novel) =

1918 novel by Arthur Wright

- Author: Arthur Wright
- Language: English
- Series: Bookstall series
- Genre: sporting
- Publisher: NSW Bookstall Company
- Publication date: 1918
- Publication place: Australia
- Pages: 155

Over the Odds is a 1918 novel by Arthur Wright.

== Plot ==
Ossy Odson is left a fortune provided he gets married by a certain date.

== Reception ==
The Sunday Times said that:

Here is a remarkable thing. In other parts of the world writers of no special merit are making large incomes by turning out conventional sporting novels. In Australia Mr. Arthur Wright, the best sporting novelist of them all, is apparently content with a purely local reputation. His latest book is well up to his standard. The people are credible, the emotions are convincing and not strained, and the sporting color is (as far as a non-sporting reviewer can judge) all that it should be. Also, the little story is a wholesome little story in its form, and it is one of those readable little stories with which one can pleasantly pass a lazy afternoon.

The Sydney Morning Herald stated that:

Arthur Wright has reduced the construction of sporting tales to an exact science. "Over the Odds" has all the qualities which have made its predecessors popular... There are abductions, false marriages, adventures of every kind, all the ingredients, in fact, of a sensational tale, and the background is the racecourse on which all of Mr. Wright's characters move with such familiar ease.
