= The Diamond Cross =

- Production company: Australian Film Syndicate
- Release date: 1911
- Running time: 2000 feet
- Country: Australia
- Language: English

The Diamond Cross is a 1911 Australian film from the Australian Film Syndicate.

It was screened in August 1911 for an orphanage. The film screened through country areas in 1911 and 1912.

It was called the "first colonial cowboy production".
