= Gambler's Gold =

- Directed by: George Young; Casper Middleton
- Based on: novel by Arthur Wright
- Starring: Casper Middleton; Roland Conway
- Cinematography: George Wilkins
- Production company: Australian Films Ltd
- Release date: 17 November 1911
- Running time: 4,000 feet
- Country: Australia
- Languages: Silent film English intertitles

Gambler's Gold is a 1911 Australian film based on the 1911 novel by Arthur Wright. It is considered a lost film.

== Plot ==
The story revolved around a man innocently accused of murder. The film was divided into chapters:

1. The Home in a Garret.
2. A Dastardly Murder.
3. Foong Lee's Opium Den.
4. Great Motor Boat Chase in Sydney Harbour.

== Cast ==
- Casper Middleton as the villain
- Ronald Conway as the hero
- E.B. Russell as Ayr Arnold
- Evelyn St Jermyn as Aileen Ayr, the heroine

== Original novel ==
Gamblers' Gold
- Author: Arthur Wright
- Language: English
- Series: Bookstall series
- Genre: sporting
- Publisher: NSW Bookstall Company
- Publication date: 1911
- Publication place: Australia
- English publication date: 1923 (pub: George Newnes)
- Pages: 191

The film was based on a novel by Arthur Wright, who specialised in stories about horse racing. The story was first serialised in a newspaper in 1910 and published in novel form a year later. It became one of his most popular books.

=== Plot ===
Two men, who are good friends, fall in love with the same woman. One of the men is successful and works as a squatter. He eventually marries the woman, and they have a daughter together. Tragically, the squatter accidentally kills his wife while attempting to strike his friend. As the years pass, the squatter is tormented by remorse, while the friend develops feelings for the squatter's daughter, who, in turn, is in love with one of her father's shearers.

=== Reception ===
A contemporary critic called the book a "wild and woolly farrago of delinquencies and stupidities. To'outline the "plot" is practically impossible. The story drifts from one absurdity to another. There seems to be no possibility of rational connection between the events: there is certainly no emotional sentiment, no principle, no characterisation, no redeeming feature whatever in the crude production."

Nonetheless film rights were sold early.

== Production ==
The film was made by the short lived Australian Film Syndicate in North Sydney.

A sequence involved the Sydney Cup race. The AJC would not allow scenes to be shot at Randwick so the producer used Victoria Park. According to Wright:

It was decided to shoot the Cup scene first. A grey — Fitz Merv, I think— won the handicap which was to represent the race for the Sydney Cup, after making a brilliant run in the straight from the rear of the field. This was a tiny stroke of luck for the producer who thereupon secured a grey horse to be used right through the picture, and when he was seen winning the Cup in the final scene the fans went crazy with delight.

The cinematographer, George Wilkins, later became a noted polar explorer under the name "Hubert". He had become cinematographer for the Australian Film Syndicate after Lacey Percival left the company to join the Australian Photo-Play Company.

== Reception ==
According to Wright the film "paid its way well... packed with action and thrills, [it] drew the crowds... If it could be shown to-day [in 1931] lecturer and all, no doubt it would be the laugh of a life time.".

A contemporary review said "the story abounds is dramatic situations, which culminate in a motor-boat chase down Sydney Harbour, the death of the villain, and a promise of future happiness for the lovers and their bright little son. All who appreciate a clean Australian story should welcome this excellent film."
