= 1872 in Australian literature =

This article presents a list of the historical events and publications of Australian literature during 1872.

== Books ==
- Louisa Atkinson — Tressa's Resolve
- B. L. Farjeon — Bread-and-Cheese and Kisses
- Maud Jeanne Franc — Jem's Hopes and What They Grew To

== Short stories ==
- Marcus Clarke — "Human Repetends"
- Henry Kingsley — Hornby Mills and Other Stories

== Poetry ==
- Henry Kendall
  - "Basil Moss"
  - "Sydney Harbour"
- Emily Manning
  - "Bodalla : A Glimpse of England Amid Australian Hills"
  - "The Explorer's Message"
- J. Brunton Stephens — "Big Ben, the Alligator"

== Births ==
A list, ordered by date of birth (and, if the date is either unspecified or repeated, ordered alphabetically by surname) of births in 1872 of Australian literary figures, authors of written works or literature-related individuals follows, including year of death.

- 27 January — Lala Fisher, poet, writer and editor (died 1929)
- 22 February — John Shaw Neilson, poet (died 1942)
- 6 March — Mabel Forrest, poet (died 1935)
- 6 June — Arthur H. Adams, poet (died 1936)
- 28 September — David Unaipon, author (died 1967)
- 8 October — Bertram Stevens, poet and editor (died 1922)

== Deaths ==
A list, ordered by date of death (and, if the date is either unspecified or repeated, ordered alphabetically by surname) of deaths in 1872 of Australian literary figures, authors of written works or literature-related individuals follows, including year of birth.

- 20 March — William Charles Wentworth, poet and politician (born 1790)
- 28 April — Louisa Atkinson, writer, botanist and illustrator (born 1834)

== See also ==
- 1872 in Australia
- 1872 in literature
- 1872 in poetry
- List of years in Australian literature
- List of years in literature
