= The Boss o' Yedden =

Book by Arthur Wright

- Author: Arthur Wright
- Language: English
- Series: Bookstall Series
- Publisher: NSW Bookstall Company
- Publication date: 1922
- Publication place: Australia
- Pages: 170

The Boss o' Yedden is a novel by Arthur Wright.
