= A Colt from the Country =

Novel by Arthur Wright

- Author: Arthur Wright
- Illustrator: Percy Lindsay
- Language: English
- Series: Bookstall series
- Genre: sporting
- Publisher: NSW Bookstall Company
- Publication date: 1922
- Publication place: Australia
- Pages: 208

A Colt from the Country is a novel by Arthur Wright. It takes place on Manly Beach and the racecourses of Sydney.
