= Cow Flat =

Coordinates: 33°33′45″S 149°31′30″E

Cow Flat is a locality near the Australian city of Bathurst.

It was the birthplace of author Arthur Wright.

Cow Flat was the site of copper mining from 1871 to around 1910. There are some remnants of the copper mine, the most notable of which is the former manager's cottage constructed of basalt blocks. Below the house are slag heaps from copper smelting. The Cow Flat copper mine and smelters were for a time owned by Lewis Lloyd.
