= The Outlaw's Daughter =

Novel by Arthur Wright

- Author: Arthur Wright
- Language: English
- Series: Bookstall series
- Genre: bushranging
- Publisher: NSW Bookstall Company
- Publication date: 1919
- Publication place: Australia

The Outlaw's Daughter is a novel by Australian writer Arthur Wright about bushranging.

== Plot ==
A bushranger, Devil Devine, abandons his daughter. Years later he holds her up and tries to marry her but is stopped. The bushranger is pursued by the boyfriend of his daughter.
