= A Crooked Game =

1930 novel

- Author: Arthur Wright
- Language: English
- Publisher: George Newnes
- Publication date: 1930
- Publication place: England
- Pages: 128

A Crooked Game is a 1930 drama horse racing novel by Australian author Arthur Wright. It was the last of his novels published in his lifetime.
