= Jasamine Freckel's Love Affair =

1921 film

- Directed by: P. J. Ramster
- Written by: P. J. Ramster
- Produced by: P. J. Ramster
- Starring: Nancy Simpson
- Cinematography: Jack Fletcher
- Release date: 14 April 1921
- Country: Australia
- Languages: Silent film English intertitles

Jasamine Freckel's Love Affair is a 1921 short Australian silent film directed by P. J. Ramster. The film imitated Mack Sennett's Bathing Beauties comedies.

It is considered a lost film.

== Cast ==
- Nancy Simpson
- Annie Parsons
- Elsa Granger
- Lydia Rich
- Fred Oppey
- Anthony Aroney
