= A Rogue's Luck =

1909 novel by Arthur Wright

- Author: Arthur Wright
- Illustrator: J. Muir Auld
- Language: English
- Series: Bookstall series
- Genre: sporting
- Publisher: NSW Bookstall Company
- Publication date: 1909
- Publication place: Australia
- Pages: 229

A Rogue's Luck is a 1909 novel by Australian author Arthur Wright. It originated as a 1907 short story.

== Plot ==
Sydney clerk Kendall Curtis disappears on the day of his marriage to Vera with a sum of money belonging to his employer, the firm of Hardgoods, Hopkins and Co. His general manager, Horace Wakefield, persuades Vera to marry him instead.

It turns out that Wakefield is leading a double life as a bookie, Doods Dodson. And that Wakefield had arranged for Curtis to be robbed on the way to the ceremony, drugged with chloroform, and dumped on a boat to Melbourne.

Wakefield/Doods then kills Vera's father. Vera and Curtis are reunited in Melbourne where Wakefield then kills a detective.

== Reception ==
The Sydney Morning Herald said the book "rejoices in a silver king, a missing bridegroom, a murder, a boxing school, and various other essential properties for a first class romance, and has the additional advantage of a local setting." The West Australian called it:

melodrama in the highest. The material is there, but terribly heavy call are made on the reader's credulity... It is all furiously improbable, but there is something about it of the interest that attaches to melodrama and charms the gallery, and while the story is in progress one for gets to impose the foot-rule of rigid experience and probability. The author has real good dramatic instinct. His incidents in themselves are well told. It is in composition that he is weak. The individual incidents could probably happen, but they could hardly happen in the way represented. At any rate Mr. Wright has imagination (albeit it wants discipline). His villains are good notable villains, and his favourites are good likeable people.
