= When Nuggets Glistened =

1918 novel by Arthur Wright

- Author: Arthur Wright
- Language: English
- Series: Bookstall series
- Publisher: NSW Bookstall Company
- Publication date: 1918
- Publication place: Australia
- Pages: 168

When Nuggets Glistened: A Cooee from '54 is a novel by Arthur Wright set during the Australian Gold Rush of 1854.
