= Girls of the Golden West =

Girls of the Golden West may refer to:

- Girls of the Golden West (opera), a 2017 opera by John Adams
- Girls of the Golden West (country music duo), an American country music duo of the 1930s and 1940s

== See also ==
- The Girl of the Golden West (disambiguation)
