= Lancelot Booth =

Lancelot Booth (24 September 1845 – 20 May 1913) was an Australian colonial actor, comedian, playwright, journalist and writer of short stories, novels and poems.

== Biography ==
=== Early life and education ===
Born in Hurworth-on-Tees, Durham, England, on 24 September 1845, Lancelot Booth was the son of Thomas Dixon Walker, medical practitioner, and his wife, Elizabeth Martindale. He was born John Joseph Walker, changing his name upon leaving England following his alleged involvement in a forgery case while employed with the Bishop Auckland branch of the National Provincial Bank of England. The fraud was widely reported in the English and Australian newspapers at the time, although his disappearance and name change meant he was never to face any charges. He went first to Australia in 1869 or 1870, then to New Zealand in July 1870, returning to Australia in 1876.

=== Career ===
In the early 1870s Booth worked on the stage in New Zealand, marrying actress Eliza Frances Eltham at the Union Hotel in Dunedin on 29 January 1873. During Booth's period in New Zealand his works for stage included: Guided by Public Opinion, or the Fortunes of a New-Chum (farce), Crime in the Clouds (drama), Formosa Married (farce), and New Magdalene.

He moved to Australia in 1876, where he initially worked on the Newcastle stage. He made his first appearance in Sydney at the Royal Victoria Theatre on 24 July 1876 as Count De Rivera in the Italian drama, Society, or a Mistake in Education. Booth was a prolific performer, appearing in more than 70 productions between 1876 and 1880, many of them alongside fellow actor Bland Holt, mainly in the Victoria Theatre and Queen's Theatre. The two first appeared together in The Steeplechase at the Royal Victoria Theatre, Sydney, on 28 October 1876 in Holt's first appearance in Sydney.

During the early to mid-1880s, he lived in Brisbane, where he was connected with the Theatre Royal, Brisbane, appearing in more than 20 productions. Booth returned to Sydney sometime after 1885 and from that time made only rare appearances on stage. He appeared as Charles Beeswing in the farce, Taming a Tiger, at the Royal Standard Theatre on 28 November 1892 and in July 1898 joined with several old actors to perform Othello to raise money for the benefit of retired actors.

Booth also wrote a number of plays including Crime in the Clouds, performed at the Royal Standard Theatre in Sydney in January 1898 by Henry's Sydney and Suburban Company and Outlaw Kelly (1899) a four Act melodrama, first performed at the Victoria Theatre (Newcastle), on Saturday, 12 August 1899, by the Henry Dramatic Company.

In addition to writing plays, he published short stories, poetry and children's fiction as well as two popular novels: The Devil's Nightcap (1912), an Australian bushranging adventure of the Frank Gardiner–Ben Hall gang, and Tools of Satan (1914), a murder mystery in an English setting, both published by the NSW Bookstall Company.

Many of his short stories and poems were published in The Queenslander. Favourite subjects were bushranging and life on the gold diggings, with many themes exploring encounters between migrants from the 'old country' and the Australian bush.

In May 1903 at the age of 58, Booth commenced on a walking tour of the north coast of New South Wales, starting at the Hunter River and ending at the Tweed River on the Queensland border and then back again. His plan was to publish an account of his travels and although he duly completed this endeavour, the account appears to have never found its way into print.

=== Death and afterward ===
Booth died on 20 May 1913 in Balmain aged 67 and is buried in Rookwood Cemetery in Sydney. His wife, Eliza, pre-deceased him 20 years earlier on 4 September 1893. Together, they had eleven children: Mark, George, Harry, Francis, Ada, Ernest, Ruby, William, Archibald, Harold and Mary.

== List of plays ==
- Crime in the Clouds (1898)
- Outlaw Kelly (1899)

== List of poems ==
- "Walter Montgomery" (1871), appears in: Wanganui Herald 17 October 1871 (p. 2)
- "The Exile's Grave: A Walk in Dunedin Cemetery" (1872), appears in: The Otago Witness 10 August 1872 (p. 20)
- "Make Us Some Ships, Papa!" (1881), appears in: The Queenslander 30 April 1881 (p. 553)
- "Flotsam and Jetsam – To a Pair of Old Boots" (1882), appears in: The Queenslander 22 July 1882 (p. 107)
- "The Post Office Clock" (1891), appears in: The Sydney Mail 19 September 1891 (p. 638)

== List of short stories ==
- "The Foundlings, or Missing Friends in Australia" (1881), appears in: The Queenslander 24 December 1881, Christmas Supplement (pp. 14–18)
- "Gold Quest: A Christmas Tale of the Early Digging Days" (1885), appears in: The Queenslander 19 December 1885, Christmas Supplement (pp. 12–14)
- "A Conditional Pardon" (1889), appears in: The Queenslander 21 December 1889, Christmas Supplement (pp. 7–10)
- "Love's Apparitions – A True Anglo-Australian Story" (1895), appears in: Sydney Evening News 23 March 1895
- "In the Bushranging Line. A Queensland Experience" (1895), appears in Evening News 15 June 1895
- "A First Offender" (1897), appears in: The Australian Town and Country Journal vol.54 no.1404 2 January 1897 (p. 12)
- "Two Christmas Crosses" (1901), appears in: The Australian Town and Country Journal vol.63 no.1662 14 December 1901 (pp. 59–60)
- "Search for Hidden Treasure" (1902), appears in: Sunday Times 14 December 1902
- "An Outlaw's Love" (1905), appears in The Sydney Mail – 4 October 1905
- "Every Bullet Has Its Billet" (1905), appears in: The Sydney Mail 13 December 1905 (p. 1528)
- "Jessie's Ride for Life and Love" (1908), appears in: Clarence and Richmond Examiner 2 May 1908
- "Abracadabra" (1908), appears in: Sydney Morning Herald 9 July 1908
- "What Happened to Andrew Crisp?" (1911), appears in: Kalgoorlie Miner 22 July 1911

== List of novels ==
- The Devil's Nightcap: The Story of the Gardiner-Hall Gang (1912), Sydney, New South Wales: N.S.W. Bookstall Company, 1912.
- Tools of Satan (1914), Sydney, New South Wales: N.S.W. Bookstall Company, 1914.

== List of children's fiction and poems ==
- "Among the Fairies" (1881), appears in: The Queenslander 25 June 1881 (p. 809)
- "Fables and Fairies" (1881), appears in: The Queenslander 9 July 1881 (pp. 42–43)
- "Fables and Fairies" (1881), appears in: The Queenslander 30 July 1881 (p. 138)
- "Fables and Fairies" (1881), appears in: The Queenslander 6 August 1881 (p. 172)
- "At the Mayor's Juvenile Fancy Dress Ball" (1881), appears in: The Queenslander 16 July 1881 (p. 74)
- "The Lambton Worm" (1882), appears in: The Queenslander 11 March 1882 (p. 298)
- "Jack and His Paschal Eggs" (1882), appears in: The Queenslander 8 April 1882 (p. 428)
