= Strike (1912 film) =

- Directed by: George Young
- Based on: story by Casper Middleton
- Starring: Casper Middleton; Roland Conway
- Production company: Australian Film Company
- Release date: 12 March 1912
- Running time: 3,000 feet
- Country: Australia
- Languages: Silent film English intertitles

Strike is an Australian film directed by George Young. It is considered a lost film.

== Plot ==
A foreigner, Von Haeke, seduces a mine-owner's daughter in order to gain access to her house and her father's money. He is about to marry the girl when his deserted wife arrives and exposes him. In revenge, Von Haeke induces the miners to go on strike, abducts the girl, and imprisons her in a mineshaft which is flooded. The hero, Jack, arrives in time to save the girl and beats Von Haeke in a fight. Von Haeke falls to his death from a cliff and Jack marries the girl.

== Cast ==
- Roland Conway
- Casper Middleton

== Production ==
The movie was made by the Australian Film Company, which was part of the Australian Film Syndicate. Part of the movie was shot in a coal mine in southern New South Wales in January 1912. In January 1912 it was reported that Casper Middleton and Roland Conway were involved in an accident at the coal mine but were uninjured.

== Release ==
The movie was advertised as being "suggested by the well-known author" Casper Middleton. It only received a limited release in Sydney.
