= Three Strings to Her Bow =

Three Strings to her Bow
- Directed by: George Young
- Cinematography: Lacey Percival
- Production company: Australian Film Syndicate
- Release date: 10 April 1911 (Sydney)
- Country: Australia
- Languages: Silent film English intertitles

Three Strings to her Bow is an Australian film directed by George Young. Now considered a lost film, it was billed as "a fine farcical comedy."
