= Mated in the Wilds =

1921 film

- Directed by: P. J. Ramster
- Produced by: P. J. Ramster
- Cinematography: Reg Fuz
- Production company: P. J. Ramster Photoplays
- Release date: 13 August 1921
- Running time: 5,000 feet
- Country: Australia
- Languages: Silent film English intertitles

Mated in the Wilds is a 1921 Australian silent film directed by P. J. Ramster. It is a melodrama about a love triangle among members of Sydney society.

The movie is considered a lost film.

== Plot ==
Two men, flying ace Justin Strong (Fred Oppey) and foreigner Montgomery Lyle (Anthony Aroney) are both in love with sportswoman Elsa Hope (Elsa Granger). Justin and Monty leave by motorcycle on a surveying trip and Monty leads his rival in the desert to die. He tells Elsa that Justin was killed by aboriginals. Elsa insists on seeing Justin's grave and drives out to the desert with Monty and her mother. Monty ties Mrs Hopes to a tree and is about to abduct Elsa but she pulls a gun on him and eventually finds Justin living with some friendly aborigines.

== Cast ==
- Elsa Granger as Elsa Hope
- Anthony Aroney as Montgomery Lyle
- Fred Oppey as Justin Strong
- Maud de Grange
- William Shepherd
- Lydia Rich
- David Edelsten
- Louis Witts
- Albert Germain
- S.P. Woodford
- Phillip Raftus
- Kathleen Ramster
- Winifred Law
- Dorothy Shepherd
- Nancy Simpson

== Production ==
The cast was unpaid and could only work weekends so the film took over a year to complete. Actors were drawn from P. J. Ramster's acting school.
