= Sophie Irene Loeb =

American journalist (1876–1929)

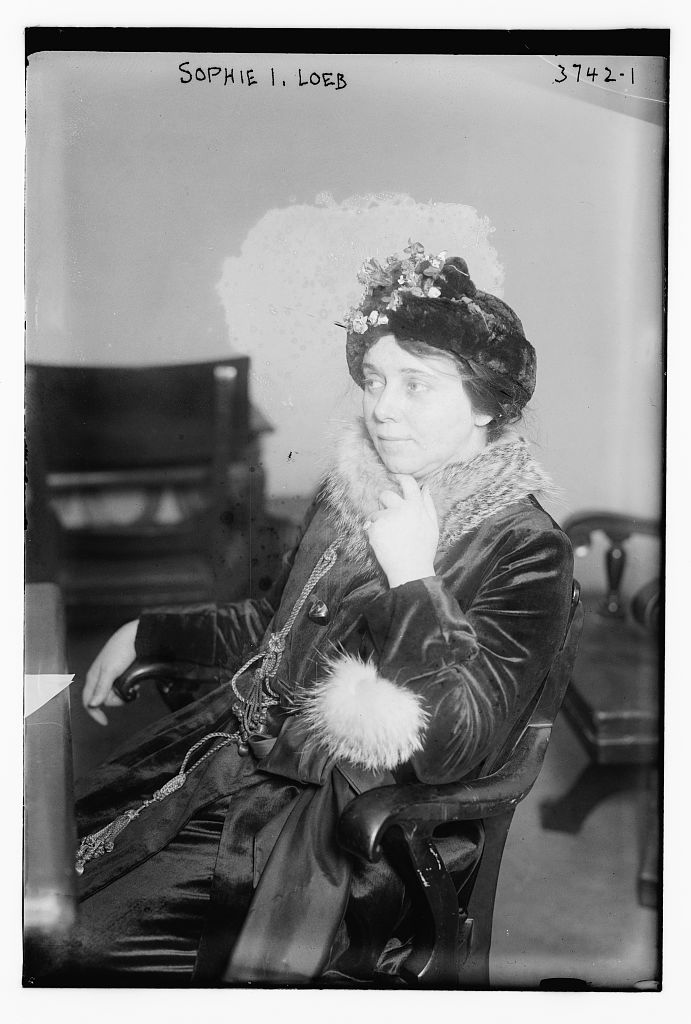
Sophie Irene Loeb

Sophie Irene Loeb (July 4, 1876, Rivne, Volhynia, Russian Empire (now part of Ukraine) – January 18, 1929) was an American journalist and social-welfare advocate.

== Biography ==
She was born Sophie Irene Simon. She was a school teacher in McKeesport, Pennsylvania, at the East End Public School before she married Ansel F. Loeb, in 1896. In 1912, she wrote the book, Epigrams of Eve, with illustrations by Ruby Lind (Ruby Lindsay.) In 1920 her novel Everyman's Child was published (The Century co., New York)

She was the president of the Board of Child Welfare of New York for seven years, and in 1921 she established the first child welfare building. In 1924, she became president of the Child Welfare Committee of America. In 1927, she was invited to work with the social service section of the League of Nations in Geneva to frame an international code for the care of dependent and afflicted children.

She died on January 18, 1929.

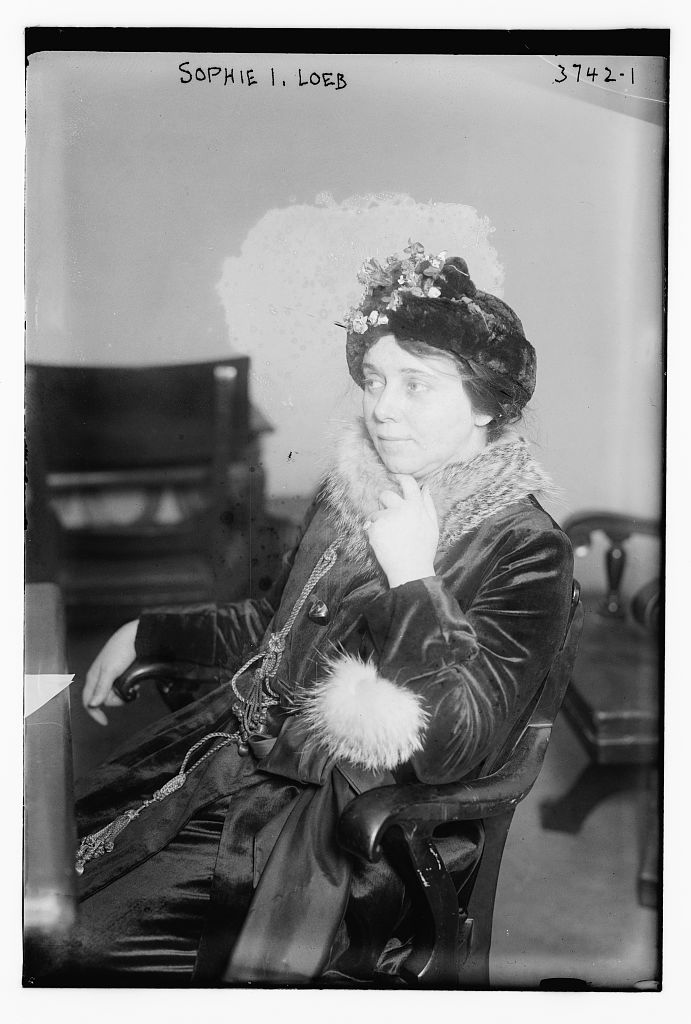

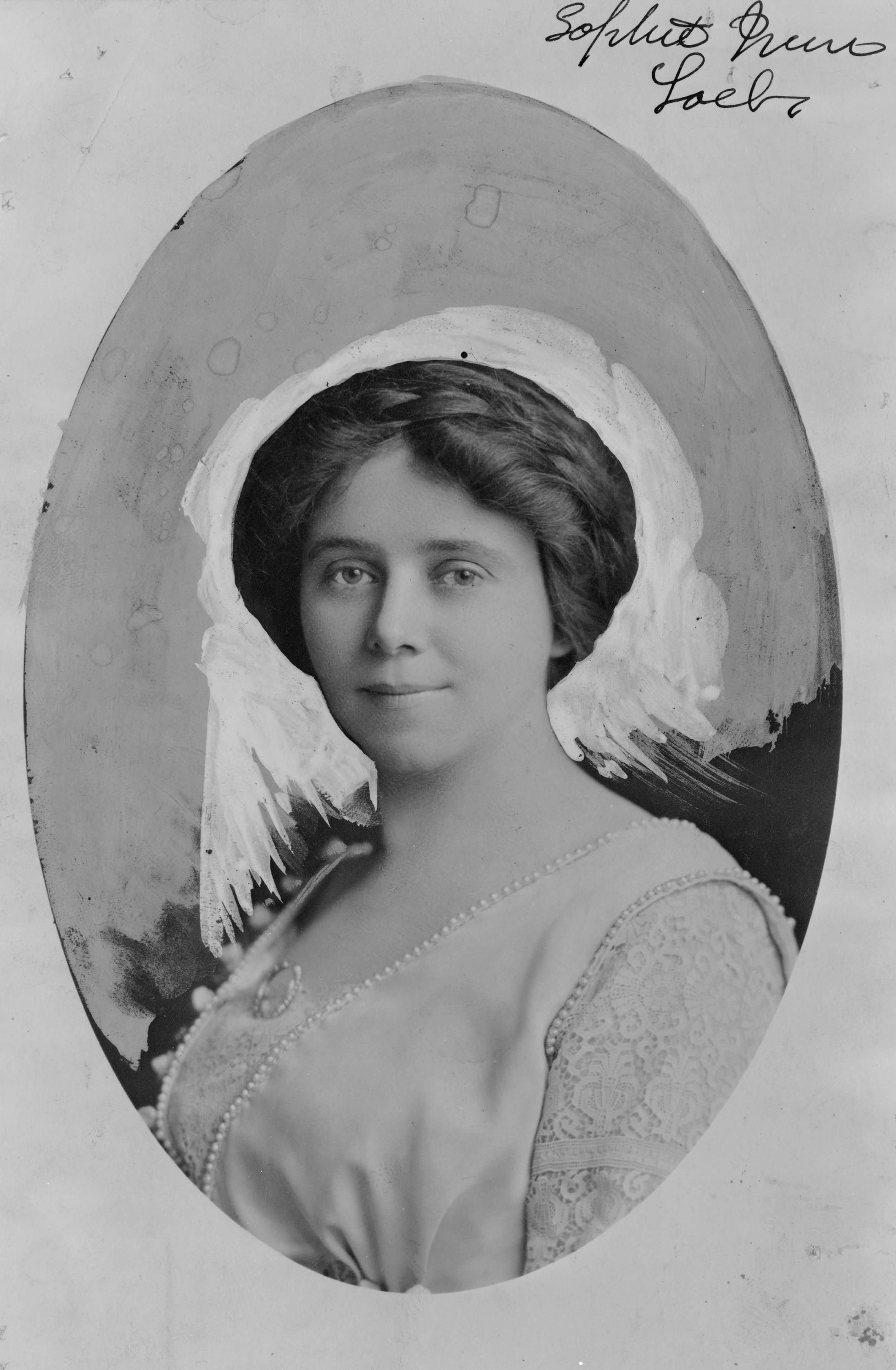

== Legacy ==
The Sophie Irene Loeb Playground is in Chinatown, Manhattan.
