= Elsa Granger =

Australian actress

Elsa Granger (died 8 February 1955) was an Australian actress who studied acting with P. J. Ramster and appeared in several of his films. She was a member of Sydney society and frequently appeared in the society columns. She travelled to Hollywood in 1922 but did not have much success.

== Filmography ==
- High Heels (1918)
- Mated in the Wilds (1921)
- Jasamine Freckel's Love Affair (1921)
- A Rough Passage (1922)
