= The Breed Holds Good =

1918 novel by Arthur Wright

- Author: Arthur Wright
- Language: English
- Publisher: NSW Bookstall Company
- Publication date: 1918
- Publication place: Australia

The Breed Holds Good is a 1918 novel by Arthur Wright. It had been serialised in 1916-17.

== Plot ==
Frank Lindsay, a squatter's son, falls in with a bad crowd during World War I.

== Reception ==
The Age said "the book has vigor, and the patriotic note is sounded effectively."
