= A Rough Passage =

1922 film

- Truth 23 July 1922
- Directed by: Franklyn Barrett
- Based on: novel by Arthur Wright
- Produced by: Franklyn Barrett
- Starring: Stella Southern; Hayford Hobbs
- Cinematography: Franklyn Barrett
- Production company: Barret's Australian Productions
- Distributed by: Franklyn Barrett
- Release date: 22 July 1922
- Running time: 6,000 feet
- Country: Australia
- Languages: Silent film English intertitles

A Rough Passage is a 1922 Australian silent film directed by Franklyn Barrett based on the novel by Arthur Wright. It was Barrett's final feature and is considered a lost film.

== Plot ==
Laurie Larand (Hayford Hobbs) returns from the war and finds himself jilted and broke. He goes to work for a horse trainer who he discovers to be in league with a book maker to fleece the horse owners.

He also comes across a Shakesperean actor, Poverty Point (Arthur Albert), who becomes his friend, and the beautiful Doiya (Stella Southern), who he falls in love with.

In the finale, Larland exposes the villains and is united with Doris.

== Cast ==
- Hayford Hobbs as Laurie Larand
- Stella Southern as Doiya Reylen
- Elsa Granger as Belle Delair
- Gilbert Emery as Jiggy Javitts
- Arthur Albert as 'Poverty' Point
- Alma Rock Phillips
- Robert McKinnon
- David Edelsten
- Sybil Shirley
- Billy Ryan
- Peter Felix

== Original novel ==
A Rough Passage
- Author: Arthur Wright
- Illustrator: Percy Lindsay
- Language: English
- Series: Bookstall series
- Publisher: NSW Bookstall
- Publication date: 1921
- Publication place: Australia
- Pages: 189

Arthur Wright's original novel was published in 1921.

=== Plot ===
Laurie Larand, a returned soldier, discovers that the barmaid he has entrusted with his money is missing. After a bad day at the races he has no money. He goes to live in the Domain but is helped by a trainer and an actor friend to get back on his feet. He discovers the trainer is in cahoots with bookmakers.

=== Reception ===
The novel appears to have been well received. "He shows to advantage as a writer of humor", said one critic. Another stated that, "Not many Australians, perhaps, are writing "literature", but quite a fair number are turning out readable and respectable yarns, and Arthur Wright is one of the number."

== Production ==
Forbes Advocate 31 Oct 1922

Everyone's reported the film was being made in February 1922 saying "The story should make a very general appeal, as it is very bright and redolent of the soil."

The film was made with Wright's close involvement. Hayford Hobbs was an English actor touring Australia when the film was made.

Hugh Ward did lighting, as he had on Know Thy Child. Aboriginal boxer Peter Felix had a role.

== Reception ==
The movie was distributed by Barrett himself, due in part to his difficulties with the Australasian Films monopoly, and was not widely seen.

Arthur Wright later said the film was:

Produced and photographed excellently by Franklyn Barrett, but bringing little grist to the mill of movie ' picture production. It was a flop financially, as were practically all the latter day local silents, which were never given the chance they deserved. Fate and oversea interests were against the Industry, which went into a decline.

In March 1922 Everyones announced "When the picture is well on the way, he [Barrett] will commence on another Australian story." However Barrett's company soon wound up and he left filmmaking to go into cinema management.

=== Critical ===
Everyone's said " Working along melodramatic lines, the continuity promises well, but breaks away into the meaningless at times... Interesting in the main, but lacks consistency. Even at that it will probably pull good business if properly exploited."

The Advertiser called the movie "a delightful comedy-drama" in which Arthur Albert "is excellently cast".

The Register called it "a stirring racing film" which "cannot fail to please the most exacting. In addition the comedy in the picture is exceedingly clever, and productive of many hearty laughs."

The Launceston Daily Telegraph said that "from the very first moment that the screen reflected the delightful panorama of our bush land I knew that here at last I had found a picture which, would prove worth while the time it had taken to produce."

The Sydney Daily Telegraph said "the story is rather a good one."

== See also ==
- List of lost films
