= Lewis Lloyd (politician) =

Politician and copper miner in New South Wales, Australia

Member of the New South Wales Parliament for West Macquarie
- In office July 1884 – 17 February 1887
- Preceded by: Thomas Hellyer
- Succeeded by: Fergus Smith

Personal details
- Born: Lewis Lloyd; 27 September 1842 Wales
- Died: 12 February 1902 (aged 59) Woollahra, New South Wales
- Resting place: Waverley Cemetery
- Spouse: Mary Ann Jones (m. 1865; died 1901)
- Children: Eleven
- Occupation: Mine and smelter operator
- Known for: Lloyd's Mine, Burraga

Lewis Lloyd (27 September 1842 – 12 February 1902) was a Welsh-born Australian mining entrepreneur and politician.

== Business career ==
Lloyd was trained at a smelter at Caermarthen, Wales. Lloyd migrated to New South Wales in 1863 to work at the copper smelter at Cadia. According to his obituary, he was a Welsh language speaker and could not speak English at the time of his emigration. Lloyd was able to use his expertise in copper smelting to obtain an interest in copper mining ventures. In at least one of his earlier ventures, he was in partnership with Saul Samuel. He went on to become a well-known mining entrepreneur and was known as the "Copper King".

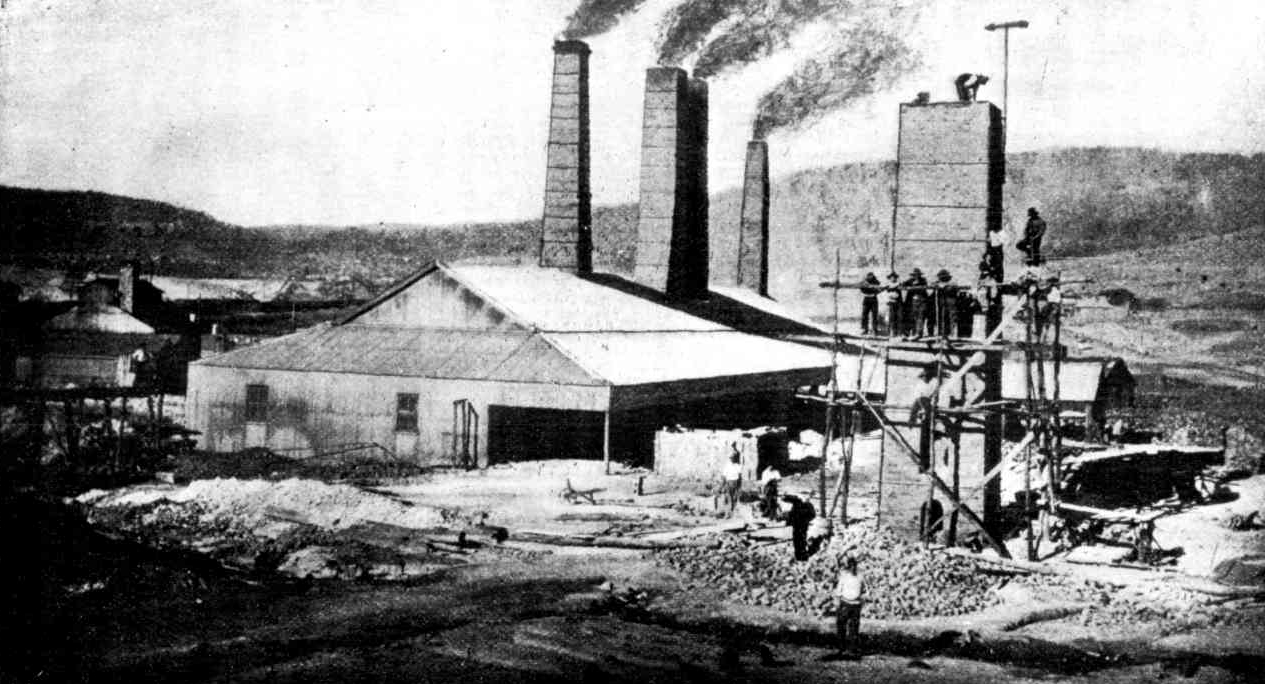
Lloyd's copper smelter at Lithgow, N.S.W. c.1903.

In 1874, he built a copper smelter at Lithgow, which he located near the Eskbank Colliery so that he could use otherwise unsaleable fine coal (then known as 'slack' coal) to fire his furnaces. His was the first of three copper smelters established in Lithgow, during the 19th century, to make use of 'slack' coal as a fuel. He was said to have had, at one time, 38 reverberatory smelting furnaces—of his own distinctive design—in operation in various parts of New South Wales, including at Currawang.

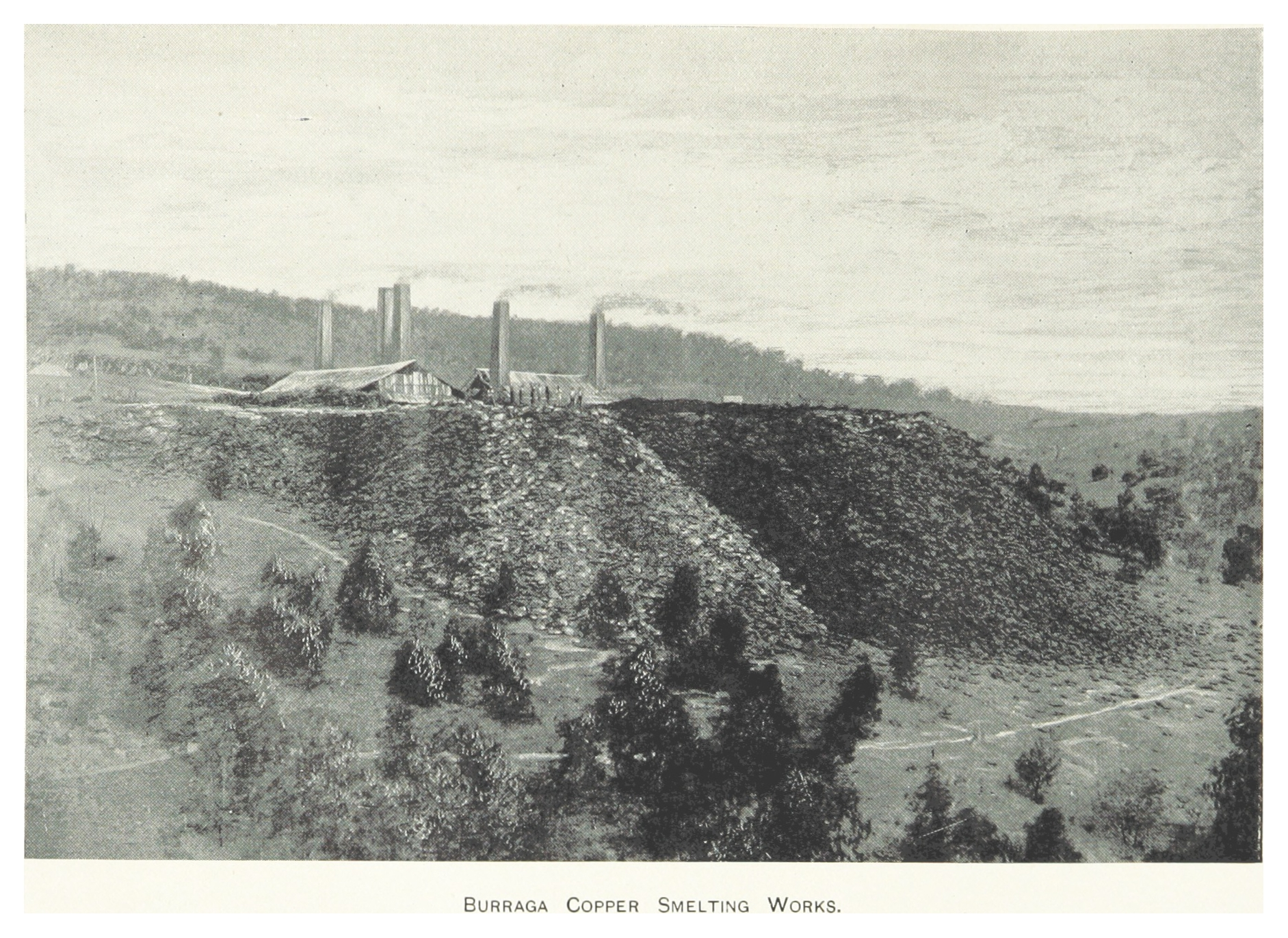
Smelting Works at the 'Lloyd's Mine', Burraga, N.S.W. c.1899.

His fortune came mainly from his sole ownership of the copper mine at Burraga—known as 'Lloyd's Mine'—which he bought in 1879. He was also involved in other copper mines in the Central West of New South Wales, at Cow Flat, Coombing Park, and Ophir. In 1899, he sold his interest in the mine at Burraga to an English company for £100,000.

== Political career ==
He was elected to the New South Wales Legislative Assembly in 1884 for West Macquarie; re-elected in 1885, he did not recontest in 1887. His political career was undistinguished; a quiet man by nature, who did not like speaking in public, he was described as an "exemplary silent member".

== Family and homes ==
Lewis Lloyd was the son of William Lloyd. In 1865, he married Mary Ann Jones, with whom he had eleven children.

During the time that he was the sole proprietor of the Burraga mine, he lived at 'Glendower', a two-storey house of sixteen rooms, on Vale Road—now Lloyds Road—South Bathurst. Years after he had sold it, on Christmas Day in 1913, that house was destroyed in a notorious fire.

He had a home in the Eastern Suburbs of Sydney, from at least the 1890s, living first at 'Mylorn', in Bondi Road, Waverley. His last home was 'Dalston', 21 Jersey Road—formerly Point Piper Road—in Woollahra.

== Death ==
Lewis Lloyd died at his home in 1902. At the time of his death, his estate was valued at £103,565, less £10,856 for probate duty, but some were surprised that he had not left more. His grave lies in Waverley Cemetery. His wife, Mary Ann, died in 1901.

He is commemorated as one of the 'Pillars of Bathurst'—in a commemorative public garden at Bathurst,— by Lloyds Road in South Bathurst, and by Lloyd Street in the now sleepy hamlet of Burraga.

New South Wales Legislative Assembly
Preceded by Thomas Hellyer	Member for West Macquarie; 1884–1887	Succeeded by Fergus Smith
