= Gaming for Gold =

1929 novel

- Author: Arthur Wright
- Language: English
- Genre: sporting
- Publisher: John Long
- Publication date: 1929
- Publication place: England

Gaming for Gold is a novel by Australian writer Arthur Wright which was published in England. It is about a New Zealand racehorse that participates in the Melbourne Cup.

"The novel is not a convincing picture of Australian conditions", said the critic from the Advertiser.
