= The Hate of a Hun =

1916 novel by Arthur Wright

- Title page for The Hate of a Hun (1916)
- Author: Arthur Wright
- Illustrator: Norman Lindsay
- Language: English
- Series: Bookstall series
- Genre: war
- Publisher: NSW Bookstall Company
- Publication date: 1916
- Publication place: Australia
- Pages: 192

The Hate of a Hun is a 1916 novel by Arthur Wright about Germans in Australia during World War I.

Prior to its publication by the NSW Bookstall Company, the novel was serialised in The World's News, commencing on 22 July 1916.
