= Hilda Bridges =

Australian novelist

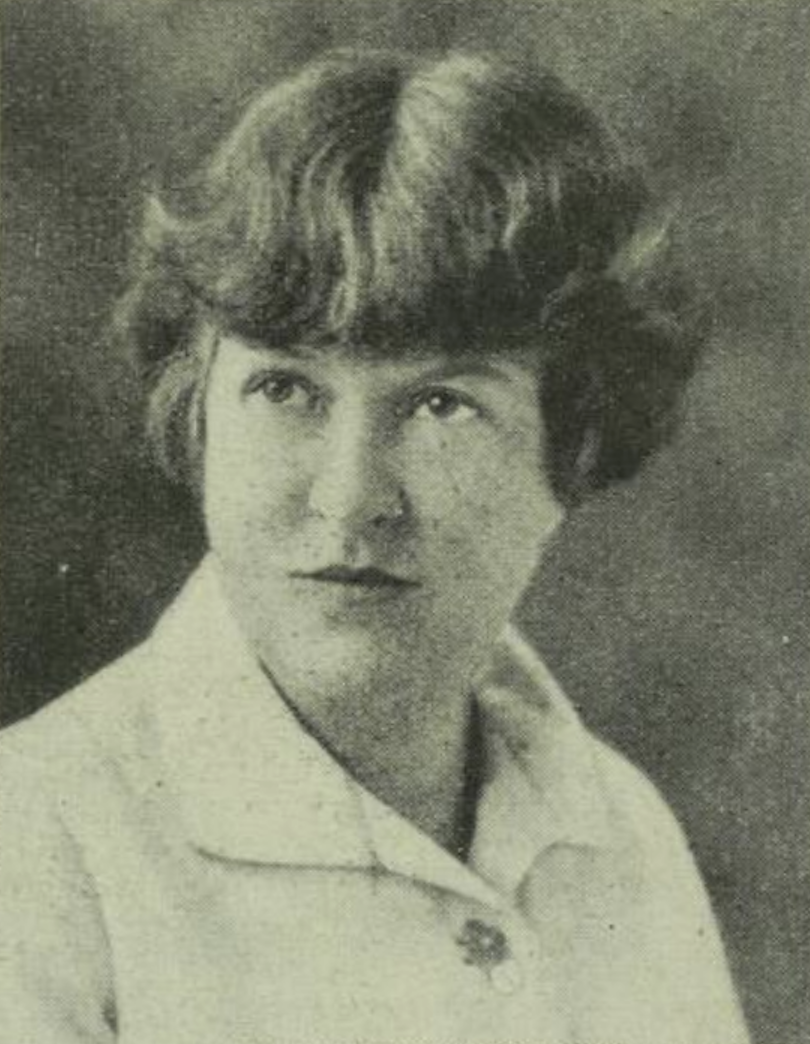
Hilda Bridges, 1928

Hilda Maggie Bridges (19 October 1881 – 11 September 1971) was an Australian novelist, short story writer and music teacher.

== Early life and education ==
Hilda Maggie Bridges was born in Sorell, Tasmania on 19 October 1881 to basketmaker Samuel and Laura Jane Bridges (née Wood). Her younger brother, Royal Tasman Bridges, known as Roy, was a journalist and novelist, for whom she acted as housekeeper, secretary and companion. Bridges was educated at Scotch College, Hobart.

== Career ==
On leaving school Bridges expected to begin teaching but, instead, she became secretary to her brother, Roy. As no typewriter was available, her work included copying his writings by hand to send to publishers. Her handwriting was "beautiful, meticulous" and "must have been loved by editors and publishers". She worked speedily, which skill translated to her own writing, for example she claimed she had "done a 45,000-words serial in a week".

In 1922 she adapted The Squatter's Daughter, the 1907 play by Bert Bailey and Edmund Duggan into a novel which was published by the NSW Bookstall Company.

In June 1939 literary writer for The Australasian described her work to that time as "16 novels, four children's books, 59 serial stories, and over 400 short stories ... commendable output for 20 years of work".

On her brother Roy's death in 1952, Bridges presented a complete set of his books to the State Library of Tasmania. At that time there was no system of legal deposits in place and the donation was applauded by Sir John Morris, chairman of the library board.

A list of Bridges' published short stories is included in her papers which are held by the University of Tasmania. It shows a further 70+ were published in the 1940s and 1950s.

== Bibliography ==
=== Novels ===
- The House of Shadows, 1922
- The Indian Desk, 1922
- Our Neighbours, 1922
- The Squatter's Daughter, 1922
- Our Neighbours, 1922
- The Web of Circumstance, 1923
- The Lady of the Cavern, 1925
- Fifty-Mile Bend, 1926
- A House in Exile, 1926
- Chinese Lacquer, 1926
- The House of Make Believe, 1928
- Spindrift, 1928
- The Poor Relation, 1929
- House of Storms, 1929
- Shadows, 1930
- Chinese Jade, 1930
- The House with Black Blinds, 1930–1931
- The Indian Chest, 1931
- The House with Creaking Doors, 1931
- Secret House, 1933
- Distant Fields, 1933
- Ship of the Mist, 1936
- Conisby's Corner, 1937
- Derelict Island, 1937
- Men Must Live, 1938
- Petals on the Stream, 1939
- Of Many Colours, 1944
- Dead Fires, 1945

=== Children's ===
- Little Brother, 1923
- Enter Valentine, 1924
- Three From Form Four, 1927
- Fourteen and Nine, 1929
- The Lucky Charm, 1933
