= A Good Recovery =

Book by Arthur Wright

- Author: Arthur Wright
- Language: English
- Publisher: NSW Bookstall Company
- Publication date: 1928
- Publication place: Australia

A Good Recovery is a novel by Australian author Arthur Wright. It was originally serialised in 1924, in the Sydney newspaper, The World's News.
