= Peter Bladen =

Australian poet

Peter Bladen (1922–2001) was an Australian poet born at Perth. He was later educated at the University of Western Australia, and the University of Melbourne. He travelled extensively through Australia, working in the 1960s as a journalist and writer, including writing for The Mavis Bramston Show. In the 1980s he moved to Turkey, where he became a Muslim and took the name Yusuf Bladen-Pryor.

His first book, The Old Ladies at Newington, won the Commonwealth Jubilee Literary Prize.

== Bibliography ==
- The Old Ladies at Newington (1953)
- Masque for a Modern Minstrel (1962)
- Millefleurs (2000) (as Yusuf Bladen-Pryor)
