= Ruby Lindsay =

Australian artist (1885–1919)

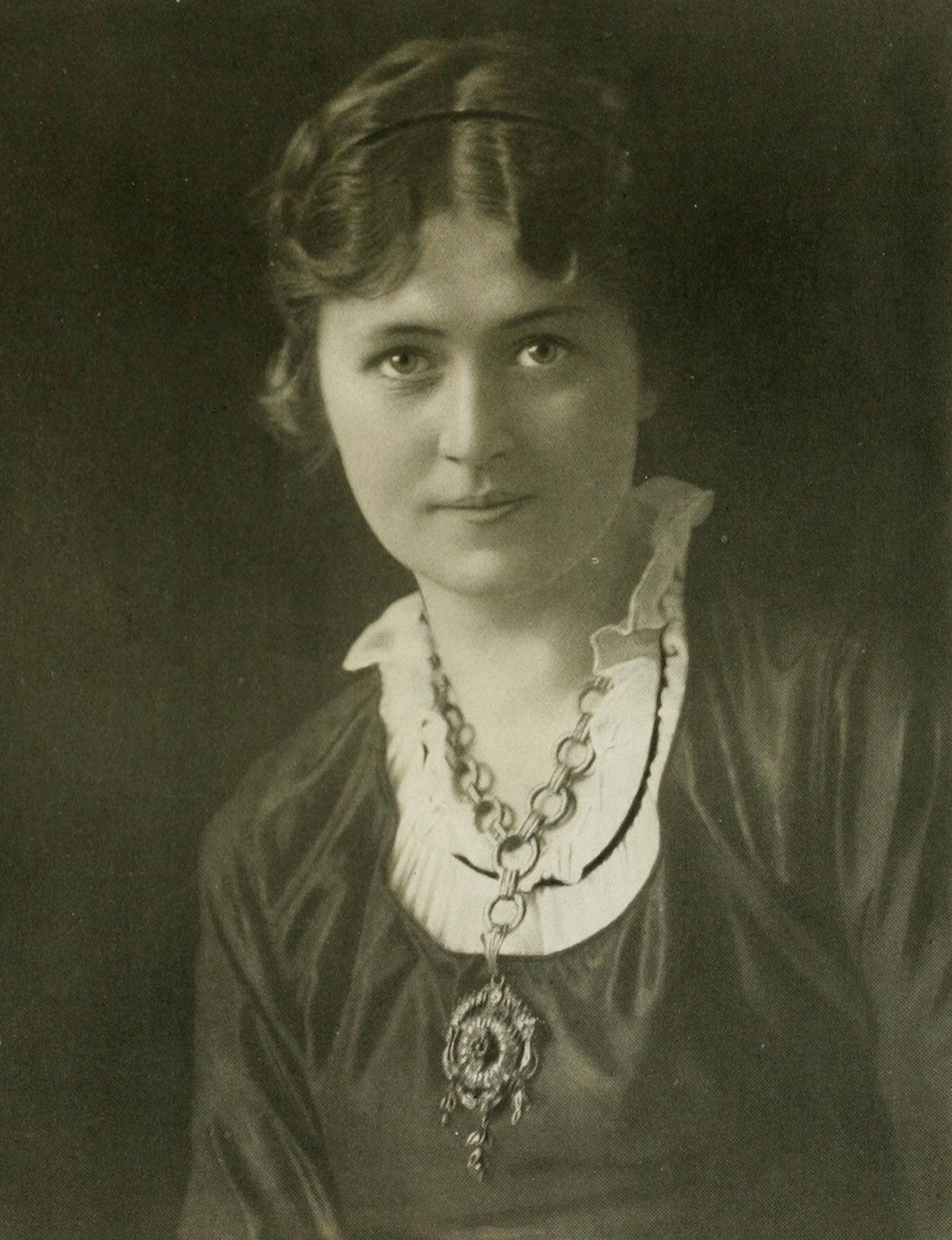
- Born: 20 March 1885; Creswick, Colony of Victoria
- Died: 12 March 1919 (aged 33); London, United Kingdom
- Known for: Illustration, Painting
- Spouse: Will Dyson
- Awards: First Prize for Best Poster at Australian Exhibition of Women's Work

Ruby Lindsay (20 March 1885 – 12 March 1919) was an Australian illustrator and painter. She was the sister of Norman Lindsay and Percy Lindsay.

== Biography ==
Lindsay was born in Creswick, Victoria, the seventh child and second daughter of Robert and Jane Lindsay, and lived in Melbourne from the age of 16 with her brother Percy while studying at the National Gallery of Victoria School.

Lindsay drew occasionally for The Bulletin and illustrated William Moore's Studio Sketches (1906) and designed posters and certificates including the Certificate First Class and a prize-winning poster for the Australian Exhibition of Women’s Work, in 1907.

As an illustrator she went by several names; signing her work as "Ruby Lyne", "Ruby Lyn", "Ruby Lind", and once as "Ruby Ramsbottom". She was described by art critic Haldane MacFall as "the most remarkable woman in the pen-line now living" in his History of Painting.

On 30 September 1909 she married Will Dyson and then left for England with him and her brother Norman Lindsay. Her brother Lionel had earlier married Will's sister Jean. Ruby and Will had one daughter, Betty (1911–1956).

In 1912, she contributed illustrations to the book Epigrams of Eve by child welfare advocate and journalist Sophie Irene Loeb. After World War I she visited relations in Ireland and died during the Spanish flu pandemic. Lindsay is buried in the same grave as her husband in Hendon Cemetery, London. Her name on the headstone is shown as "Ruby Lind".

== Gallery ==
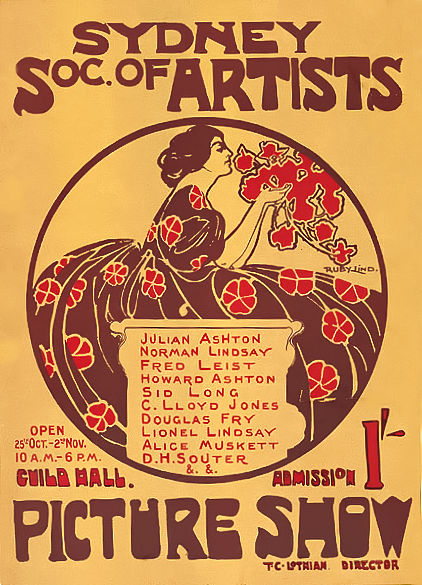
Society of Artists exhibition poster, 1907

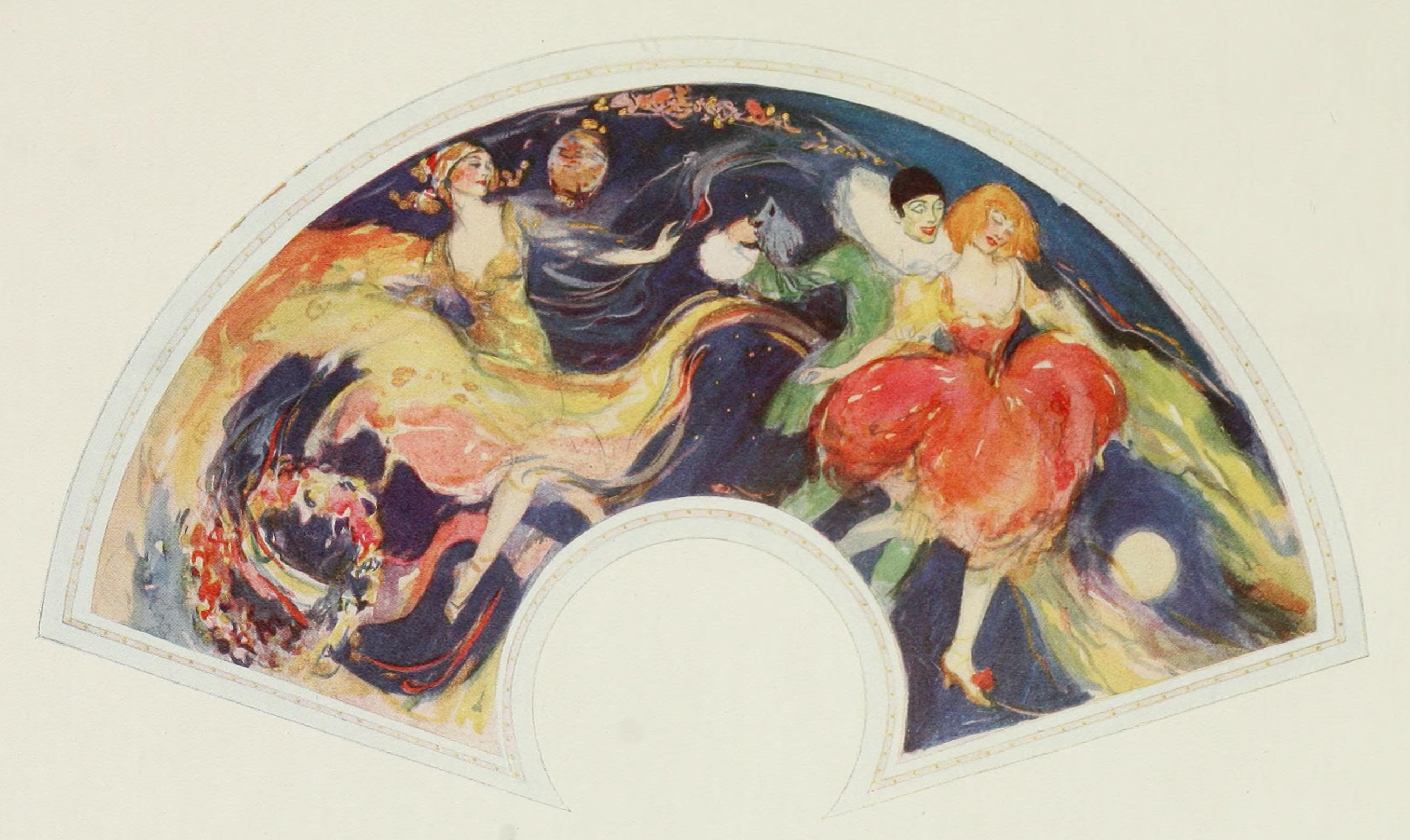
Fan design

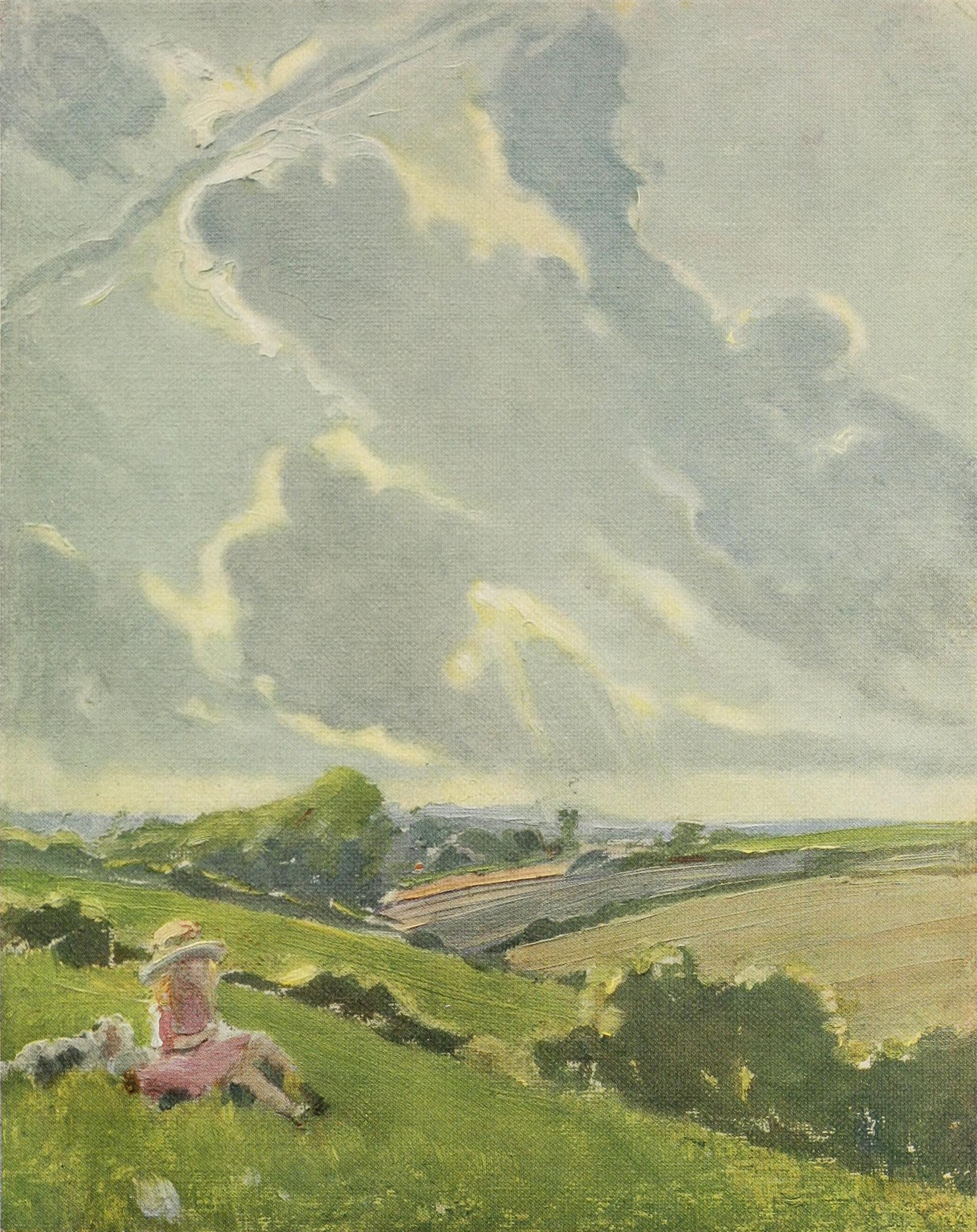
Princes Risborough

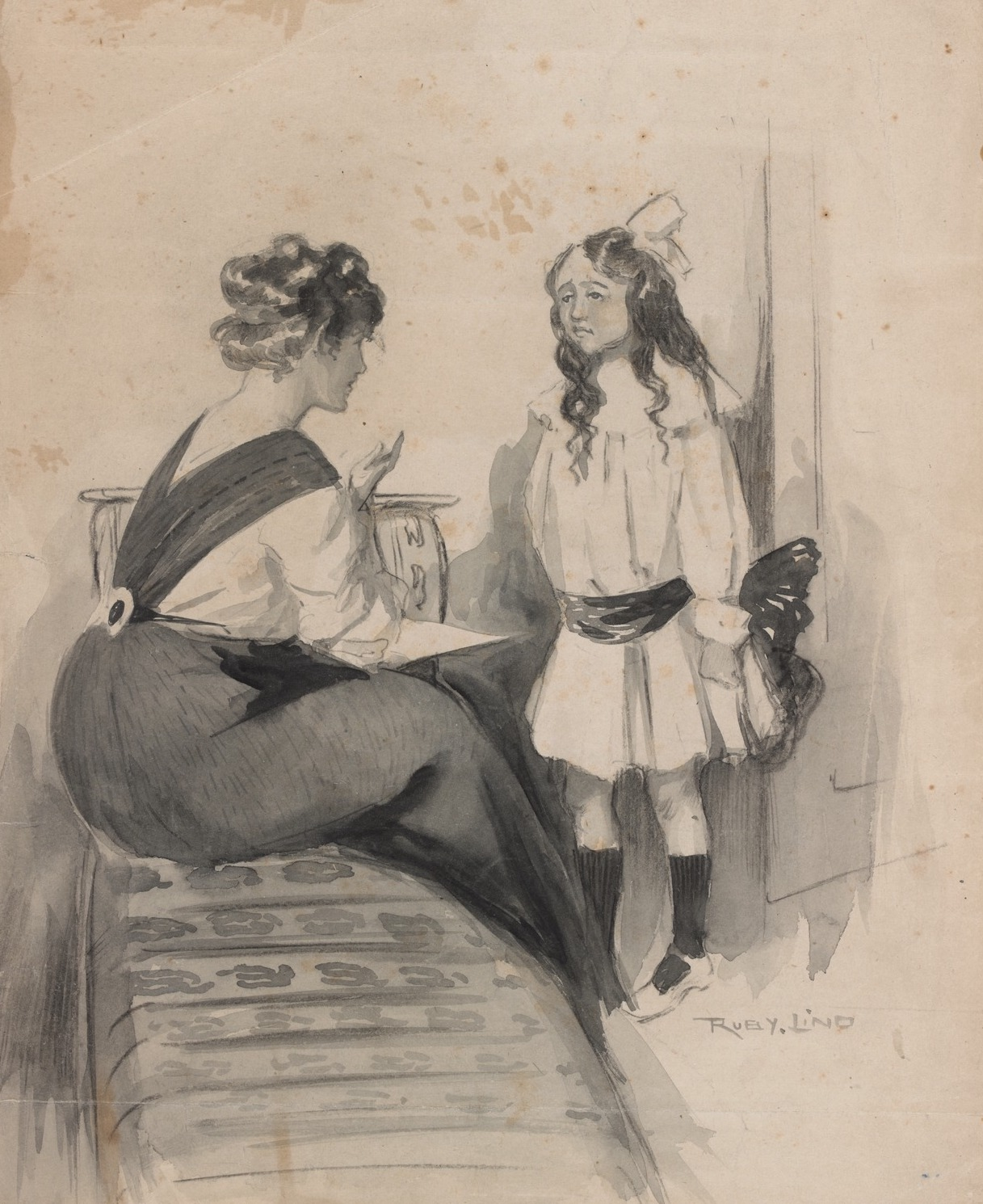
Mother and child sketch

== Books ==
- The Drawings of Ruby Lind (Mrs Will Dyson)
- Naughty Sophia by Winifred Letts, illustrated by Ruby Lind
- Epigrams of Eve by Sophie Irene Loeb, illustrated by Ruby Lind
- What Eve said by Sophie Irene Loeb, illustrated by Ruby Lind
- Fables of everyday folk by Sophie Irene Loeb, illustrated by Ruby Lind
- The cynic's autograph book. no. 2 by Celt, illustrated by Ruby Lind
- Hello, Soldier!: Khaki Verse by Edward Dyson, illustrations by Will Dyson, Ruby Lind and George Dancey
- At the "Labour in Vain" : being the reflections and recollections of an idle man by Harold Hansell, illustrated by Ruby Lindsay

== See also ==
- 1916 Pioneer Exhibition Game
