= Peter Pinney =

Australian writer (1922–1992)

Peter Pinney (Note: He is not to be confused with another Australian writer called Peter Pinne, who was also a television executive.) (1922 – 1992) was an Australian writer.

Pinney was educated in Port Moresby and at Saint Ignatius' College, Riverview. During World War II, he served in the Middle East and New Guinea. After the war, he began writing travel books starting with Dust on my Shoes. His papers are at the University of Queensland.

== Select writings ==
=== Travel books ===
- Dust on my Shoes (1952)
- Who Wanders Alone (1954)
- Anywhere But Here (1956)
- The Lawless and the Lotus (1963)
- Restless Men (1966)
- To Catch a Crocodile (1976)

=== Novels ===
- Ride the Volcano (1960)
- Too Many Spears (1978)
- The Barbarians: A Soldier's New Guinea Diary (1988)
- The Glass Cannon: A Bougainville Diary 1944-45 (1990)
- If It's Two O'Clock its Muckadilla (1991)
- The Devil's Garden (1992)
