= The Girl of the Golden West =

The Girl of the Golden West may refer to:

- The Girl of the Golden West (play), a 1905 play by David Belasco, and his 1911 adaptation of it into a novel
- The Girl of the Golden West (opera) or La fanciulla del West, a 1910 opera by Giacomo Puccini, adapted from Belasco's play
- The Girl of the Golden West (1915 film), a film by Cecil B. DeMille
- The Girl of the Golden West (1922 film), a German silent film
- The Girl of the Golden West (1923 film), a film by Edwin Carewe with Sylvia Breamer
- The Girl of the Golden West (1930 film), a lost film by John Francis Dillon with Ann Harding
- The Girl of the Golden West (1938 film), a film by Robert Z. Leonard with Jeanette MacDonald
- Girl of the Golden West (1942 film), an Italian film by Carl Koch

== See also ==
- Girls of the Golden West (disambiguation)
