= A Sport from Hollowlog Flat =

1915 novel by Arthur Wright

- Author: Arthur Wright
- Language: English
- Publisher: NSW Bookstall Company
- Publication date: 1915
- Publication place: Australia

A Sport from Hollowlog Flat is a 1915 novel by Arthur Wright. It consisted of a series of short stories he had published previously for various magazines.

== Plot ==
A city clerk is fired due to over fondness for horse racing. He sinks lower and lower, playing two up and even trying to con a visitor from the country, the "sport" from Hollow Log Flat. However the sport takes pity on him and takes him to the bush, where the clerk redeems himself.

== Earlier publication ==
Some of the material had been published prior:

- "The Interference of Dinan Arthur Wright": The Bulletin, 8 April vol. 30 no. 1521 1909; (p. 43-44)
- "The Stiffening of Quandong": The Australian Town and Country Journal, 11 December vol. 75 no. 1975 1907; (p. 52)
- "Graham's Old Man": The Bulletin (Xmas edition), 13 December vol. 27 no. 1400 1906; (p. 18)
- "A Whirlwin": The Bulletin, 4 January vol. 27 no. 1351 1906; (p. 40)
- "A Close Call": The Australian Town and Country Journal, 7 November vol. 73 no. 1918 1906; (p. 32)

== Reception ==
The Sydney Morning Herald said that "Mr. Wright is quite in his element in his descriptions of construction camps, country race meetings, and tho Iniquities connected therewith, and... he gives us some graphic and occasionally humorous pictures of various phases of life outback."

== Theatre adaptation ==
A Sport of Hollow Log Flat
- Original language: English
- Written by: Arthur Wright
- Genre: rural comedy

Premiere
- Date: 1927

Stage rights were optioned almost immediately by the Bert Bailey Company, which had enjoyed success with adaptations of Australian rural stories, and in 1916 the Company announced it would soon present a stage version of the book.

However the play did not appear to be produced by Bailey. It emerged in 1927 in a production from William Ayr and his Bush Players, who had worked with E. J. Cole. This production was seen in the bush by Benjamin Fuller when he was on holiday; Fuller liked it and the play transferred to Melbourne in August 1928 for a successful run. The production then moved to Sydney and toured around Australia.

One critic described the Melbourne production as "a farcical comedy on very broad lines, with little attempt at character depiction or any convincing atmosphere."
