= The Golden West (1911 film) =

- Directed by: George Young
- Cinematography: Lacey Percival
- Production company: Australian Film Syndicate
- Release date: 27 March 1911
- Running time: 2,500 feet
- Country: Australia
- Languages: Silent film English intertitles

The Golden West is an Australian film directed by George Young set in the Australian goldfields. It is considered a lost film.

== Premise ==
"A sensational story of the West Australian goldfields in the 70s."

== Production ==
This was the first movie from the Australian Film Syndicate, which was formed in early 1911 with the financial backing of a draper, doctor and squatter from Goulburn. Their low-budget films were directed by George Young and their technical department was run by Jack Wainwright and Lacey Percival.

The company ran out of a small studio and laboratory in North Sydney but did not last long due to poor financial returns for their movies.
