= Rung In =

1912 novel by Arthur Wright

Rung In: A Tale of the Turf, Interwoven with a Murder Mystery and a Love Story
- Author: Arthur Wright
- Language: English
- Genre: sporting
- Publisher: NSW Bookstall Company
- Publication date: 1912
- Publication place: Australia

Rung In: A Tale of the Turf, Interwoven with a Murder Mystery and a Love Story is a 1912 novel by Australian writer Arthur Wright.

== Reception ==
The West Australian gave it a bad review:

It seems to be a pity, therefore, at this early stage of Australian literature that popular fiction of the local brand should be so largely of the sporting "shilling shocker" type. The Sydney Bookstall Company has officiated as sponsor to several Australian novelettes racy of the soil and of more than merely ephemeral interest; but in the main its vogue is confined to two topics – bushranging, and "sport" -in its turf gambling aspect and the inferences to be drawn therefrom are not flattering to the Australian popular taste. In Rung In we have one of the worst samples of fiction devoted to turf rogueries and "smartnesses."
