= The Squatter's Secret =

Book by Arthur Wright

- Author: Arthur Wright
- Language: English
- Publisher: NSW Bookstall Company
- Publication date: 1928
- Publication place: Australia

The Squatter's Secret is a 1928 romantic adventure novel by Arthur Wright (1870-1932). Like most of Wright's novels, it appeared in serialised form in newspapers prior to publication.
