= George Cockerill (journalist) =

Australian journalist and writer

George Cockerill (1871 – 3 June 1943) was an Australian journalist and writer. He was born in Bendigo, Victoria, and worked all his life as a journalist, starting on The Bendigo Independent then as Chief of Staff for the Ballarat Star before moving to the Melbourne Age where he covered the Federation campaign 1898–1901, and Federal Parliament 1901–10. He was their chief of staff and chief leader-writer 1914–26, in which position he was reckoned as one of Australia's most influential writers on fiscal policy, particularly in his support for protectionism.

He was editor of the Sydney Daily Telegraph from 1926-28.

From 1929–39, when he retired because of ill health, he was chief of publicity for the Commonwealth Development and Migration Commission and also leader writer for the Melbourne Herald. He died at Mercy Hospital, Melbourne.

He was president of the Melbourne Press Club from 1909.

== Private life ==
George was married to Mary Ellen Cockerill (who died in 1949), with sons John Leo, Captain George Sampson Cockerill (died 1948) and Dr. John Edward Cockerill and daughters Marjorie Kavanagh and Bernadette, who was killed in an accident in 1941. He had many close friends in politics, notably William Morris Hughes and King O'Malley.

== Publications ==
- Down and Out: A Story of Australia's Early History, 1912
- The Convict Pugilist, 1912
- In Days of Gold, 1926
- Building the Commonwealth - Australia's Protective Policy, 1926.
- Scribblers and Statesmen (1944) memoirs with an introduction by W M Hughes

== Sources ==
- The Oxford Companion to Australian Literature (2nd ed.) Oxford University Press, Melbourne 1994
