= Neville Henry Cayley =

Australian artist (1853–1903)

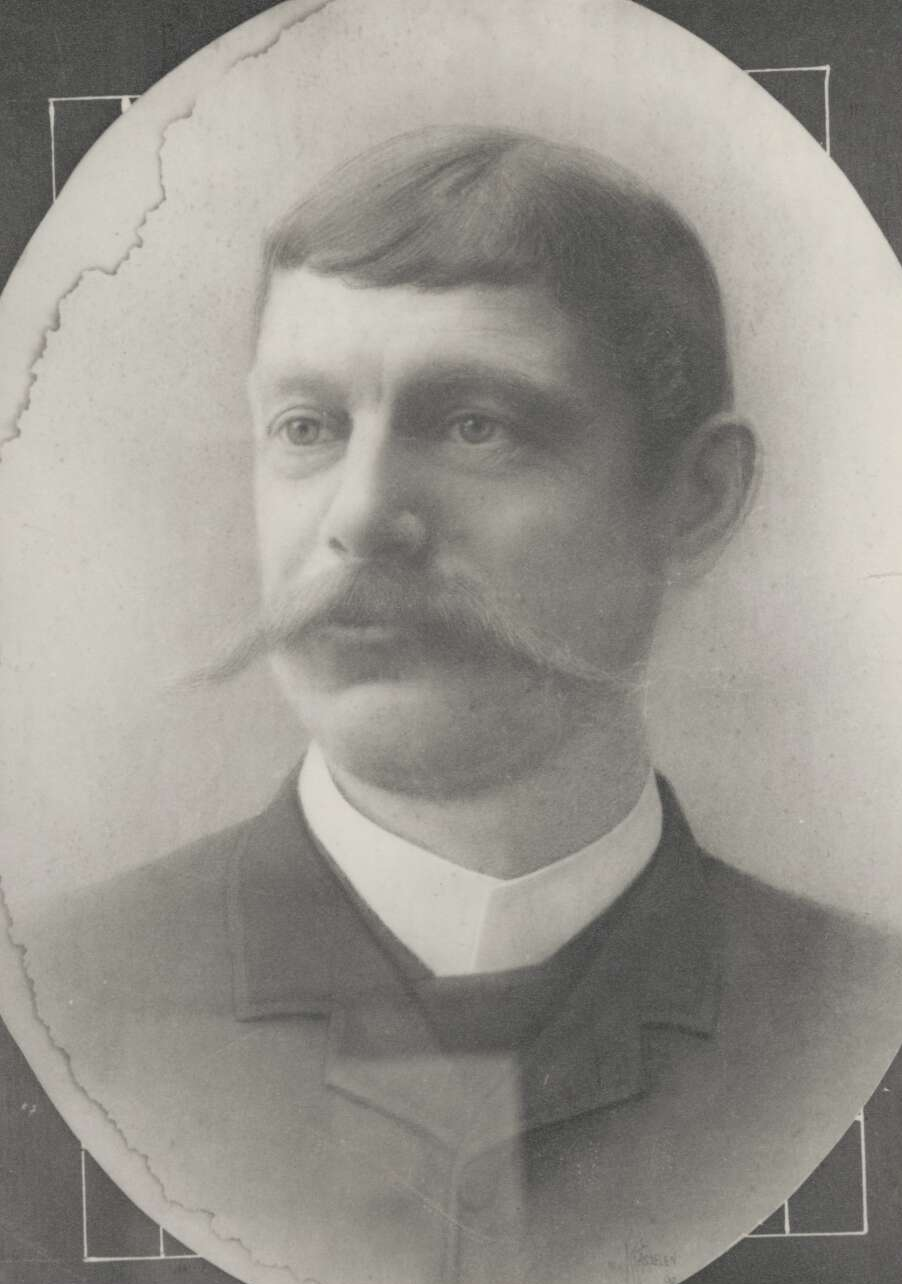
- Born: 1854, 1853; Dover
- Died: 1903 (aged 48–49)
- Occupation: Ornithologist, artist

Neville Henry Peniston Cayley (born Caley; 29 May 1854 – 7 May 1903) was an Australian painter who contributed greatly to public awareness of Australian birds through his meticulous and attractive watercolours of iconic species.

Cayley was born in Norwich, Norfolk, England on 29 May 1854. His parents were Nathaniel Henry Caley (a silk merchant) and Emily Dunn. In 1871 he was working as an assistant draper in Norwich, Norfolk. Neville Caley and his brother, William Herbert Stillingfleet Caley, migrated to Australia in 1877 where they changed their surname to Cayley, adopting the spelling of the surname of the English aristocratic family, to whom they were not, however, related. In 1885 he married Lois Emmeline Gregory in Sydney, New South Wales.

As a painter he first attracted fairly widespread attention with bird paintings in the second annual exhibition of the Art Society of New South Wales.

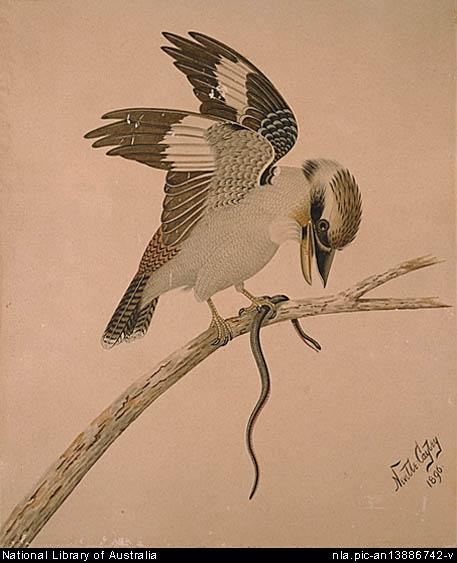
Kookaburra and snake, 1895

Cayley was the father of Neville William Cayley, the noted ornithologist and bird artist. He always signed his paintings "Neville Cayley" whereas his son signed as "Neville W Cayley".

Neville Cayley died in Sydney from the effects of Bright's disease on 7 May 1903. He was later interred at Waverley Cemetery.

== Publications ==
- Australian Gamebirds 1888
- Australian Birds: a beautiful coloured series, NSW Bookstall Co. 1900?
