= Percy Lindsay =

Australian artist (1870–1952)

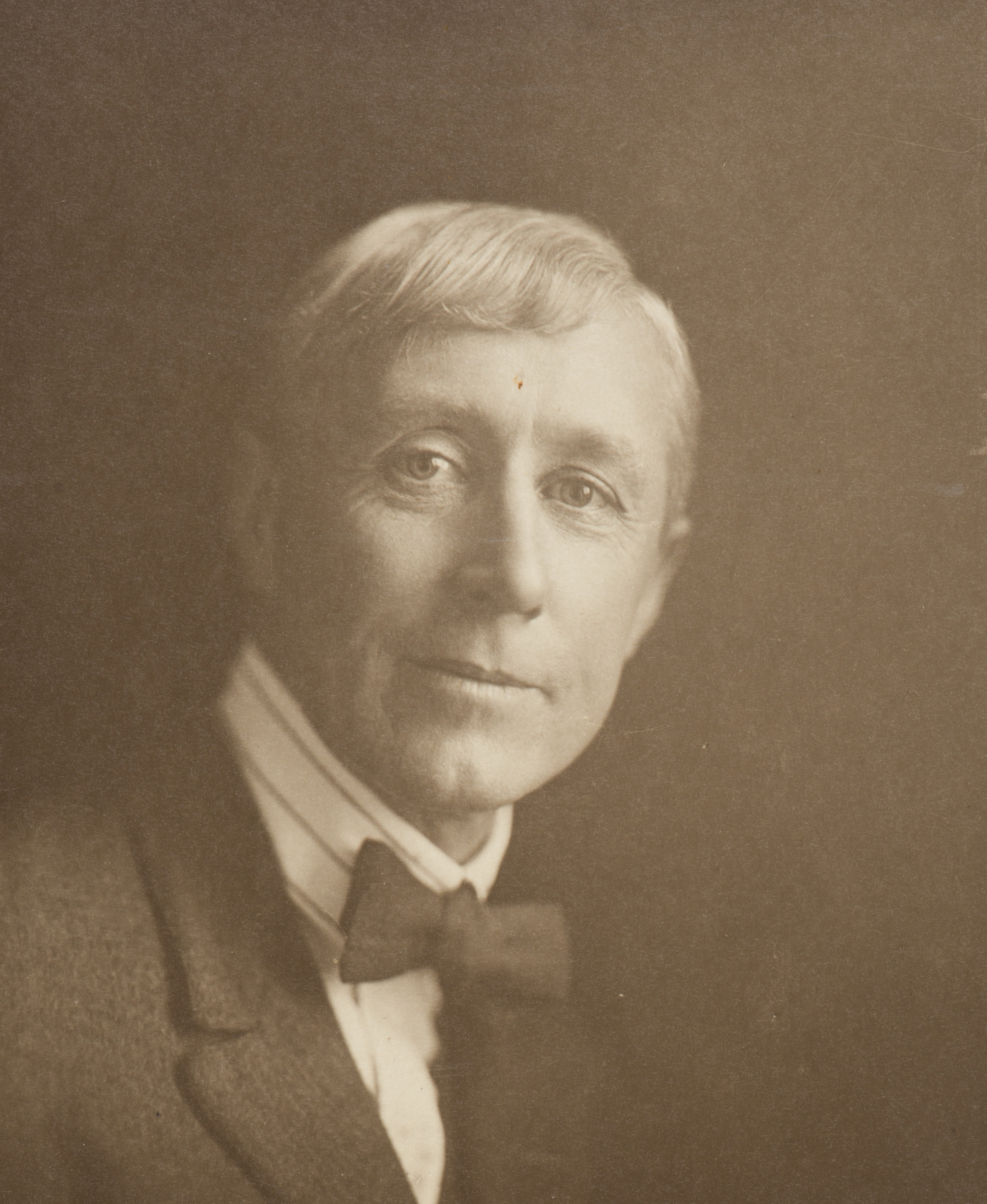
- Percy Lindsay, 1920, by May Moore
- Born: September 17, 1870; Creswick, Colony of Victoria
- Died: September 21, 1952 (aged 82); St George's Hospital, London, England
- Occupations: artist; cartoonist

Percival Charles "Percy" Lindsay (17 September 1870 – 21 September 1952) was an Australian landscape painter, illustrator and cartoonist. Born in Creswick, Victoria, he was the first child born to Jane Lindsay (née Williams) and Dr Robert Charles Lindsay. His siblings included the well-known artists: Sir Lionel Lindsay, Norman Lindsay, Ruby Lindsay and Sir Daryl Lindsay.

Percy first began painting while at school and further developed his skills during the late 1880s. Tuition from Fred Sheldon and Walter Withers saw him develop his painting skills to a professional level.

Lindsay moved to Melbourne in the 1890s and worked as an illustrator and cartoonist. During his time in Melbourne. he was at the centre of the city's bohemian art community. In 1918 he moved with his wife and child to Sydney, where he continued to paint landscapes while working as a cartoonist on The Bulletin magazine.

Percy is the least known of the five Lindsay artists and is best remembered for his fine landscape paintings and his happy carefree personality. The artist had a retrospective exhibition of his work at the Ballarat Fine Art Gallery (BFAG) in 1975. An accompanying essay by the then BFAG director Ron Radford was included in the exhibition catalogue. A biography on the artist was published by Australian Scholarly Publishing in 2011.
