= Ambrose Pratt =

Australian writer

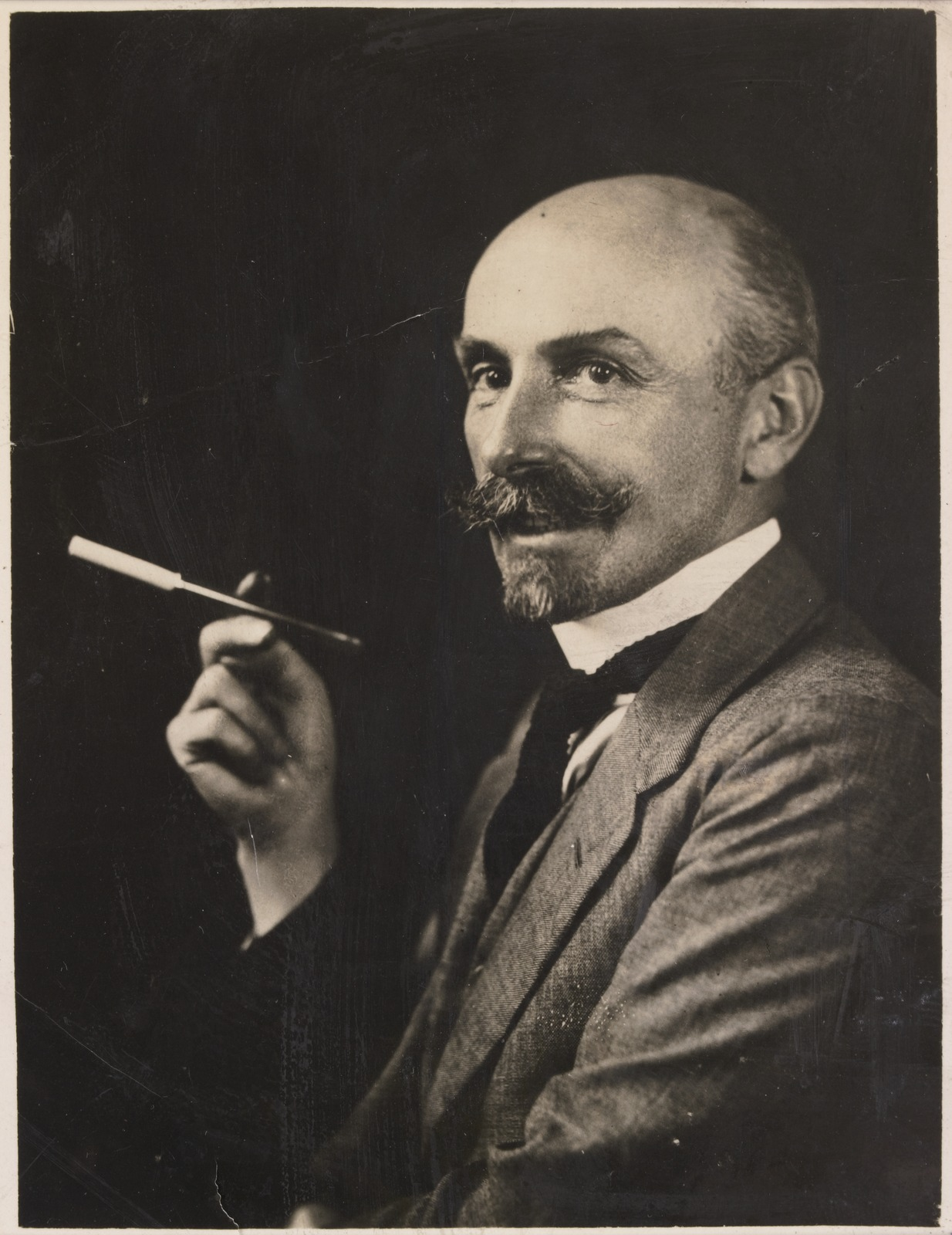
- Portrait of Ambrose Pratt.
- Born: Ambrose Goddard Hesketh Pratt; 31 August 1874; Forbes, New South Wales
- Died: 9 June 1944 (aged 69); Surrey Hills, Victoria, Australia
- Occupations: writer & journalist
- Spouse: Eileen May Roberts
- Parent(s): Dr. Eustace Henry Lever Pratt & Caroline (née Kershaw)

Ambrose Goddard Hesketh Pratt (31 August 1874 – 13 April 1944) was an Australian writer born into a cultivated family in Forbes, New South Wales.

== Early life ==
Pratt was the third of seven children of Eustace Pratt, a well-connected physician fluent in Mandarin Chinese who had spent some time in India and China, and was a friend of Henry Parkes and Edmund Barton. His grandfather Henry Pratt, also a medical man, had in his later years become obsessed with Eastern religions and philosophies of India and Tibet. Ambrose himself was brought up by an amah and educated at St Ignatius' College, Riverview and Sydney Grammar School. He had private tutors for French, German, and the manly arts boxing, riding, fencing and shooting. After abandoning studies in Medicine, he took up Law.

== Writing career ==
Around the time of his university studies Pratt began writing pro-labour (and anti-Asian immigration) articles for The Australian Worker. Once qualified as a solicitor, he rose to admission to the Supreme Court of New South Wales in 1897. But this life must not have suited him, as he left to follow a more adventurous existence, including work on a Pacific trading steamer and as a Queensland drover.

He travelled to England where he commenced writing novels and stories for magazines such as The Bulletin and The Lone Hand, and began what was to become a career in journalism with the Daily Mail which brought him back to Australia in 1905.

He joined The Age as a journalist in 1905, gaining considerable influence (David Syme was a mentor), and was a member of the party with Prime Minister Andrew Fisher visiting the newly founded Union of South Africa for the opening of its parliament. In 1918, as a prominent protectionist in the tariff debate then raging, became founding editor and part-owner of the Australian Industrial and Mining Standard to 1927. He was involved in companies mining for tin in Malaya and Siam.

Pratt's novels frequently focussed on criminal outsiders such as "The Push" (a Sydney larrikin element analogous to the "bodgies" of the 1950s, "rockers" of the 1960s and "bikies" of today), and bushrangers such as Captain Thunderbolt and Ben Hall.

== Other activities ==
With retirement from journalism, he became involved with keeping Australian fauna in the Melbourne Zoological Gardens, being president 1921–36 of the Zoological and Acclimatization Society of Victoria, and later vice-chairman of the Zoological Society of Victoria. With his friend William Colin Mackenzie he founded the research station at Healesville.

He was a proponent (from around 1925) of The Ghan railway to Alice Springs and rode in the VIP carriage during the inaugural journey. In 1933 he founded the League of Youth with the aim of encouraging citizenship and love of nature. His politics, initially pro-labour, had turned decidedly conservative from the time of the Australian Labor Party split of 1916. His mining and newspaper investments may have been a contributing factor. By 1931, as a member of "The Group", he was helping ease the departure of Joseph Lyons from the Labor Party, including the writing of his resignation speech.

== Bibliography ==
Among his 30-odd novels are

King of the Rocks Hutchinson, London 1900 (not 1898)
Franks: Duellist 1901 (not 1899)

aka Spiller og Duellant : Roman
aka Den högsta hasarden Holger Schildts förlagsaktiebolag, Stockholm 1919

The Great 'Push' Experiment Grant Richards, London 1902
The Doings of Vigorous Daunt, Billionaire serialised in Harmsworth London Magazine 1903

(ill. Stanley L Wood) Ward Lock & Co., London 1905.

aka Billionaren : afventyrsroman

The Counterstroke Ward Lock & Co. London 1906

aka Nihilister
aka Det Hemmelige Forbund : Roman

The Leather Mask 1907

aka Manden med Masken 1907

The Remittance Man Ward Lock & Co. London 1907

aka Jan Digby (not "Bigby")

The Outlaws of Weddin Range Ward Lock & Co. London 1907

(ill. Sir Lionel Lindsay) NSW Bookstall, Sydney 1911

The Big Five serialised in The Lone Hand 1907–08
First Person Paramount (ill. J MacFarlane) Ward Lock & Co., London 1908.
The Living Mummy Ward Lock and Co, London 1910

Frederick A Stokes, New York 1910

Karoola NSW Bookstall, Sydney 1911
Dan Kelly 1911
A Daughter of the Bush Ward Lock and Co, London 1912
Wolaroi's Cup NSW Bookstall, Sydney 1913
The Golden Kangaroo NSW Bookstall, Sydney 1913
The Mysterious Investment Sydney 1914
War in the Pacific Critchley Parker, Australia 1914.

NSW Bookstall Company 1923

aka Love in War Time : a tale of the South Seas
aka Kaerlighed i Krigstid. En Fortaelling fra Sydhavsoerne

Her Assigned Husband Simpkin Marshall Hamilton Kent & Co. London 1916
Everyman (poems) Speciality Press, Melbourne 1933
Lift Up Your Eyes Robertson & Mullens, Melbourne 1935

Non-fiction publications include

Three Years with Thunderbolt (ed. George Monckton) States Publishing Co. 1905
David Syme: The Father of Protection in Australia Ward Lock & Co, London 1908
The Real South Africa Bobbs Merrill, Indianapolis 1912
Notes on the Laws and Customs of War 1914
The Red Book: a Post-Bellum Policy for the British People 1914
Edwardian South Africa: Grudges and Repulsion
Why Should We Fight for England Australian Statesman and Mining Standard 1917
The Judgment of the Orient (as by K'ung Yuan Ku'suh) E P Dutton and Co 1917
The Australian Tariff Handbook 1919
British Railways and the Great War 1921
Magical Malaya Robertson & Mullens 1931
The Elements of Constructive Economics 1931
The Lore of the Lyrebird The Endeavour Press 1933 (reprint Robertson & Mullens 1940) ISBN 1-135-89952-5
The Art of John Kauffmann Manuscripts: A Miscellany of Art and Letters no. 7 1933
The Centenary History of Victoria 1934
The Handbook of Australia's Industries 1934
The Call of the Koala Robertson and Mullens, Melbourne 1937
Handmaids of the Sun Robertson & Mullens, Melbourne 1944
Sidney Myer: a biography Quartet Books Australia 1978

== Legacy ==
Pratt ended his life an opponent of the White Australia Policy and attempted to ameliorate the kind of xenophobia prevalent at the time (and finding support in the pages to The Bulletin) with his writings, exemplified by his 1941 play A Point in Time. His book The Real South Africa similarly had what would now be regarded as a remarkably enlightened view of the position of Black South Africans.

In 1941, Pratt was appointed as a Commander of the Order of the White Elephant by the government of Thailand, for his service as consul-general in Australia. He was the first Australian inducted into the order.

His portrait by Charles Wheeler won the 1933 Archibald prize.

The Ambrose Pratt section of the Royal Zoological Gardens in Melbourne is named for him.
