= Under a Cloud (novel) =

1916 novel by Arthur Wright

- Author: Arthur Wright
- Language: English
- Genre: sporting
- Publisher: NSW Bookstall Company
- Publication date: 1916
- Publication place: Australia
- Pages: 187

Under a Cloud is a 1916 book by Arthur Wright.

== Plot ==
A jockey deliberately rides his horse to defeat in order to secure the hand of the girl he loves. He is disqualified from riding and the girl marries his rival. Ten years later he returns looking for revenge.

== Reception ==
The West Australian called it "a story remarkable for its sensationalism if for nothing else." A book critic from the Australian Worker said that:

At times Wright moves his characters so quickly that he seems to lose tab of their doings. For instance, in his latest book, 'Under a Cloud'... he makes his hero put 5s. on a horse at 20 to 1 and collect ten sovereigns when the mare wins! Either Wright is a bad arithmetician or that bookmaker was altogether too generous to shout the odds in the ear of a wicked world. Still, the average sensation-seeker doesn't mind a mere errors in arithmetic when exciting deeds are oozing out of every page. And, unfortunately for the reputation of Australia's literary taste, the Wright class of novel, which is the wrong class, seems doomed to unprecedented success.
