= Australian Film Syndicate =

Australian film production company

The Australian Film Syndicate was an Australian film production company based in North Sydney. According to novelist Arthur Wright, "A local draper put a lot of money into it, and lost it; though all the films produced were not 'duds.' One which paid its way well was an adaptation of my novel, Gamblers Gold".

== History ==
The company was formed in May 1911. Wright wrote "a draper and a medico found the finance. They also lost it".

In November 1911 it was announced the Australian Film Company was formed with a capital of £20,000 to make movies for the Australian Film Syndicate. The Australian Film Company went into liquidation in 1913.

An advertisement of June 1911 pushing The Octoroon said the company had also made The Shadow of the Rockies, Black Talbot and Diamond Cross. In June 1911, the actor EB Williams was reported as working for them.

The company was involved in various lawsuits.

According to Lacey Percival, six films were made for the Australian Film Syndicate.

There was a fire at the Melbourne office of the JD Williams Australian Film Company in November 1911.

The Australian Film Company was liquidated in April 1913. (Another Australian Film Company appeared to emerge in following years).

== Filmography ==
- The Golden West (27 March 1911)
- Three Strings to Her Bow (10 April 1911)
- Black Talbot (11 August 1911 preview)
- The Diamond Cross (11 August 1911 preview)
- Gambler's Gold (November 1911)
- Strike (March 1912)
- The Octoroon
- The Shadow of the Rockies
