= Arthur Wright (writer) =

Australian writer (1870–1932)

Arthur Wright (1870 – 19 December 1932) was an Australian writer best known for his novels set against a background of the sporting world, particularly horseracing, which meant he was often compared during his lifetime to Nat Gould. In his lifetime he was called "Australia's most prolific novelist".

== Biography ==
Wright was born in the small town of Green Swamp near Bathurst. His family lived in Bathurst, then Cow Flat before moving to Sydney.

Wright was educated at Paddington Public School, worked for a sewing machine firm, then went bush for a few years, doing various odd jobs in places like the mines, shearing sheds and railways. He returned to Sydney and worked for the Water and Sewerage Board for eight years.

While at the Water Board, Wright began to write in his spare time, and his short stories started appearing in magazines such as The Bulletin.

His first novel, Keane of Kalgoorlie was a big success, launching his career as a novelist. He wrote mainly for the Bookstall series of the NSW Bookstall Company, which published Australian paperback novels aimed at the mass market and available for around one shilling a book. By 1914 it was estimated Wright had sold 60,000 copies of his books, but he continued to work as a wharfinger in the Sydney suburb of Manly up until his death. He would work six days a week on the wharf for the Port Jackson and Manly Steamship Company, and write his novels on Sundays.

Towards the end of his life Wright began to publish his work in London. His most popular novels were Keane of Kalgoorlie, Gambler's Gold and Rogue's Luck.

=== Death ===
Wright died in a private hospital in Manly. He was survived by his wife Elizabeth and seven children. He remained as an employee of the Port Jackson Ferry Company at the time of his death, and flags were flown at half mast on Manly ferry as a sign of respect.

== Filmmaking ==
Several of Wright's novels were filmed and he also wrote screenplays. In 1931 he wrote a piece on the Australian film industry:

To those who seek a market overseas for their product, I would say this: Apart from the Great War, it is sport which has placed Australia on the map. Australia is noted for its cricketers, its footballers, scullers, swimmers, and athletes generally, to say nothing of its horses and horsemen. Our native country is world-famous from a sporting viewpoint; then give the world pictures of the things in which we excel: show them our racecourses, our playing fields, our surfing beaches, and our racing craft on Sydney Harbour. Then the world will sit up and take notice.

== Critical reception ==
Wright's work was not highly regarded critically at the time. This contemporary review of Gambler's Gold appeared in the West Australian:

Judging from this latest publication by the author of 'Keane of Kalgoorlie', imaginative literature in Australia has got down to the deadest low water of spring-tide ebbs. The story is full of murders, horse-stealings, and turf frauds, drunks and welshers. This fact, however, does not invalidate the right to claim for the compilation Australian authenticity – all these things can be substantiated by police court reports in evening newspapers. The trouble is that there is no coherency in this wild and woolly farrago of delinquencies and stupidities. To outline the "plot" is practically impossible. The story drifts from one absurdity to another. There seems to be no possibility of rational connection between the events: there is certainly no emotional sentiment, no principle, no characterisation, no redeeming feature whatever in the crude production.

However another contemporary writer declared that:

Arthur Wright's sporting yarns have a real Australian ring about them. The villainies of the turf underworld are laid bare by his pen, and he never fails to secure a triumph for straight racing in the end. What this author doesn't know about the inner workings of the racing world is not worth learning. Through all his books the romance of love commands adequate attention but he doesn't dawdle over the subject. There is a directness in all his writings that permits no stumbling. His books lend themselves to dramatisation and to the biograph.

Another profile said "Wright cherishes no illusions about his work. He knows it is not Art. He seeks to climb no 'Parnassus of Pure Prose; nor does he wish to be buried in Westminster Abbey. He writes for the simple honest reason that he wants to make money."

According to one obituary "Wright never claimed for his novels that they were for highbrows but he believed that they were capable of pleasing the multitude that loves sporting and detective fiction. In this belief he was justified."

== Writings ==
=== Short stories ===
- Dwyer's Sweep (1904) – in The Bulletin vol. 25 no. 1289 27 October 1904 periodical issue pg. v
- Old Bundaroo (1904) – in Steele Rudd's Magazine 7 May 1904 periodical issue pg. 23
- A New Years Eve (1904) – in The Bulletin vol. 25 no. 1298 29 December 1904 periodical issue pg. 35
- The Shearing of Skinng (1905) – in Steele Rudd's Magazine July 1905 periodical issue pg. 651-653
- A Night on the Track (1905) – in Steele Rudd's Magazine October 1905 periodical issue pg. 838-840
- Foster's Joke (1905) – in Steele Rudd's Magazine October 1905 periodical issue pg. 897-900
- The Undoing of Johnson (1905) – in Steele Rudd's Magazine vol. 2 no. 11 December 1905 periodical issue pg. 1086–1089
- Keane of Kalgoorlie (1906)
- A Whirlwind (1906) – in The Bulletin vol. 27 no. 1351 4 January 1906 periodical issue pg. 40
- A Close Call (1906) – in The Australian Town and Country Journal vol. 73 no. 1918 7 November 1906
- In Memoriam (1906) – in The Bulletin vol. 27 no. 1366 19 April 1906 periodical issue pg. 39
- Paddy's Market Desperado (1906) – in The Bulletin vol. 27 no. 1380 26 July 1906
- Graham's Old Man (1906) – in The Bulletin (Xmas edition) vol. 27 no. 1400 13 December 1906
- A Penny Dreadful Victim (1907)
- The Stiffening of Quandong – in The Australian Town and Country Journal vol. 75 no. 1975 11 December 1907
- A Christmas Eve (1908) – in The Bulletin (Xmas edition) vol. 29 no. 1504 10 December 1908
- The Interference of Dinan (1909) – in The Bulletin vol. 30 no. 1521 8 April 1909
- Black Talbot the Bushranger (1910)
- Her Desperate Plunge (1911)
- The Cardsharper (1918)
- A Call from the Country (1922)

=== Novels ===
- Keane of Kalgoorlie (1907)
- A Rogue's Luck (1910)
- Gambler's Gold (1911)
- Rung In (1912)
- In the Last Stride (1914)
- A Sport from Hollowlog Flat (1915) – later adapted into a play
- The Hate of a Hun (1916)
- Under a Cloud (1916)
- Over the Odds (1918)
- The Breed Holds Good (1918)
- When Nuggets Glistened (1919)
- The Outlaw's Daughter (1919)
- A Game of Chance (1919)
- A Rough Passage (1920)
- Fettered by Fate (1921)
- The Boss o'Yedden (1922)
- A Colt from the Country (1922)
- The Boy from Bullarah (1925)
- The Squatter's Secret (1927)
- A Good Recovery (1928)
- Gaming for Gold (1929)
- A Crooked Game (1930)

=== Screenplay ===
- The Loyal Rebel (1915)
