= Bookstall series =

Series of Australian 1 shilling books

The Bookstall series was a series of Australian books published by the NSW Bookstall Company from 1904 onwards.

Among the novelists published under the series were Ambrose Pratt and Arthur Wright.

The books were sold for one shilling and consisted of Australian authors and topics. It was the idea of A. C. Rowlandson.
