= 1929 in Australia =

- Decades: 1900s; 1910s; 1920s; 1930s; 1940s
- See also: 1929 in Australian literature; Other events of 1929; Federal election; Timeline of Australian history

The following lists events that happened during 1929 in Australia.

1929 in Australia
- Monarch: George V
- Governor-General: John Baird
- Prime minister: Stanley Bruce, then James Scullin
- Population: 6,393,883
- Elections: Federal, VIC, QLD

== Incumbents ==
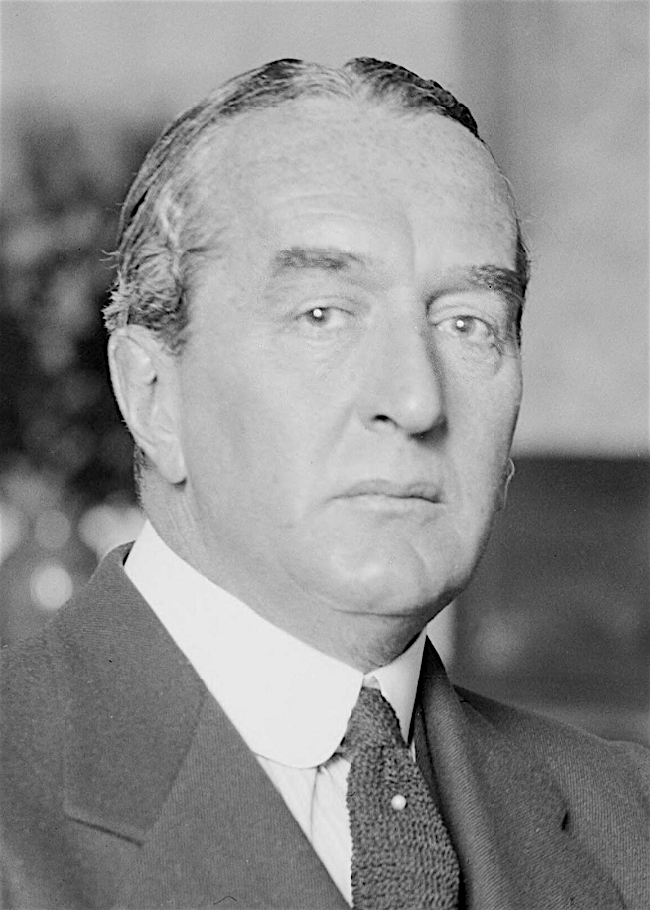
Stanley Bruce

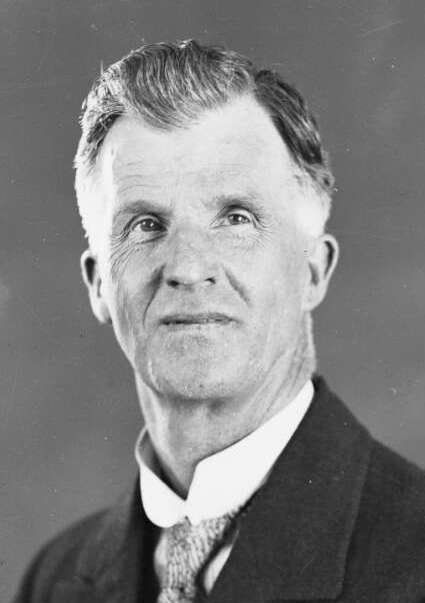
James Scullin

- Monarch – George V
- Governor-General – John Baird, Baronet of Stonehaven
- Prime Minister – Stanley Bruce (until 12 October), then James Scullin
- Chief Justice – Adrian Knox

=== State premiers ===
- Premier of New South Wales – Thomas Bavin
- Premier of Queensland – William McCormack (until 21 May), then Arthur Edward Moore
- Premier of South Australia – Richard Layton Butler
- Premier of Tasmania – John McPhee
- Premier of Victoria – William Murray McPherson (until 12 December), then Edmond Hogan
- Premier of Western Australia – Philip Collier

=== State governors ===
- Governor of New South Wales – Sir Dudley de Chair
- Governor of Queensland – Sir John Goodwin
- Governor of South Australia – Sir Alexander Hore-Ruthven
- Governor of Tasmania – Sir James O'Grady
- Governor of Victoria – Arthur Somers-Cocks, 6th Baron Somers
- Governor of Western Australia – Sir William Campion

== Events ==
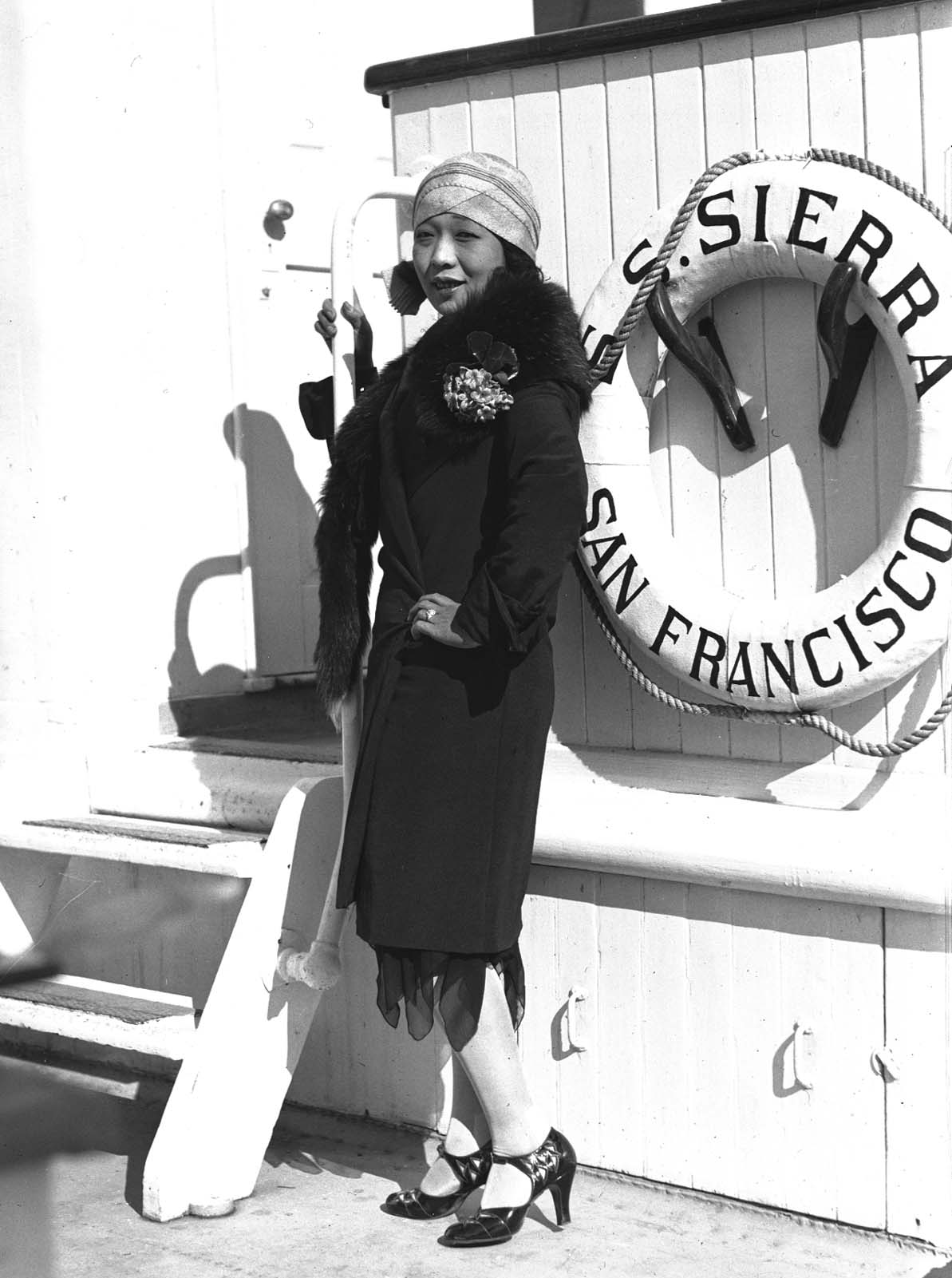
Japanese vaudeville performer, singer and comedian Kono San (or Konosan) on board SS Sierra, Sydney 1929.

- Centenary of Western Australia
- 4 April – 1929 Tasmanian floods: A dam on the Cascade River in Tasmania collapses. The subsequent torrent floods the town of Derby, killing fourteen people.
- 3 June – Fremantle, Western Australia is proclaimed a city.
- 12 October – A federal election is held. James Scullin leads the Australian Labor Party to victory over the incumbent government of Stanley Bruce. Bruce becomes the first Prime Minister to lose his seat in an election.
- 30 November – A state election is held in Victoria.
- 12 December – Premier of Victoria William Murray McPherson refuses to resign after the election, but is defeated by a no confidence motion in the first meeting of parliament. He retires, with Edmond Hogan assuming the premiership.
- 16 December – Rothbury Riot in which police shoot at locked out miners, killing Norman Brown.

== Arts and literature ==
What'll we do, when the wattle blooms again? 1929 by Reginald Stoneham

- 18 January – Sir John Longstaff wins the 1928 Archibald Prize for his portrait of Alexander Leeper.

== Sport ==
- 3 January – Don Bradman makes 112 for Australia v England in the third Test match at Melbourne, his first Test Century.
- 5 November – Nightmarch wins the Melbourne Cup.
- The Australia national rugby league team embarked on the 1929–30 Kangaroo tour of Great Britain.
- New South Wales wins the Sheffield Shield
- England defeats Australia 4–1 in The Ashes series
- South Sydney win the 1929 New South Wales Rugby Football League premiership, defeating Newtown 30–10.
- Collingwood football club win their third consecutive AFL Priemiership flag, after an undefeated home and away season. (They go on to win the flag again in 1930 and remain to date [2012] the only team to win 4 flags in a row).

== Births ==
=== January - February ===
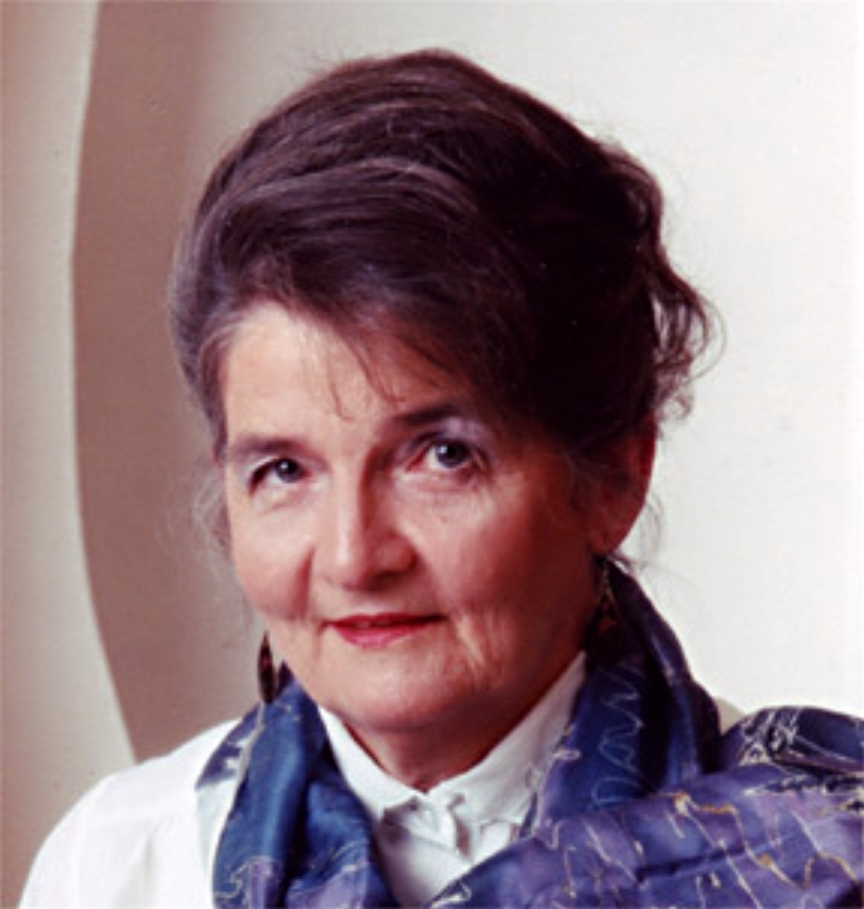
Valerie Yule

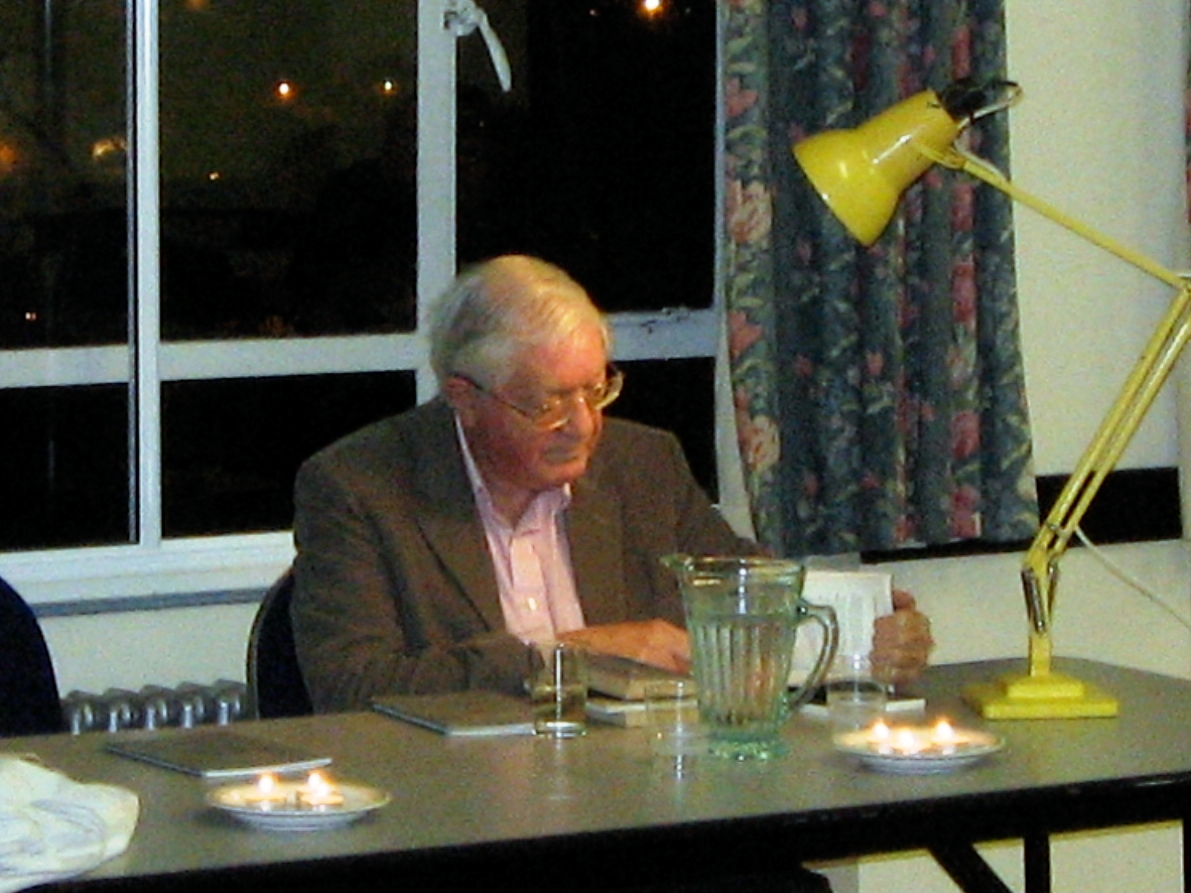
Peter Porter

- 2 January – Valerie Yule, child psychologist (d. 2021)
- 5 January – Veronica Brady, religious sister and academic (d. 2015)
- 7 January – Robert Juniper, artist (d. 2012)
- 18 January – Eric Robinson, Queensland politician (d. 1981)
- 27 January – Barbara York Main, arachnologist (d. 2019)
- 30 January – Maggie Fitzgibbon, actress and singer (d. 2020)
- 31 January – John Stone, Queensland politician (d. 2025)
- 1 February – R. A. Simpson, poet (d. 2002)
- 2 February – Desmond Ford, theologian (d. 2019)
- 7 February – John Sullivan, New South Wales politician
- 8 February – Jack Simpson, Victorian politician (d. 2015)
- 9 February – Clement Meadmore, sculptor (d. 2005)
- 10 February – Sandy McPhie, Queensland politician (d. 2015)
- 16 February
  - Kevin Manser, actor (d. 2001)
  - Peter Porter, poet (d. 2010)
- 26 February – Donald Metcalf, medical researcher (d. 2014)
- 27 February – Jack Gibson, rugby league footballer and coach (d. 2008)

=== March - April ===
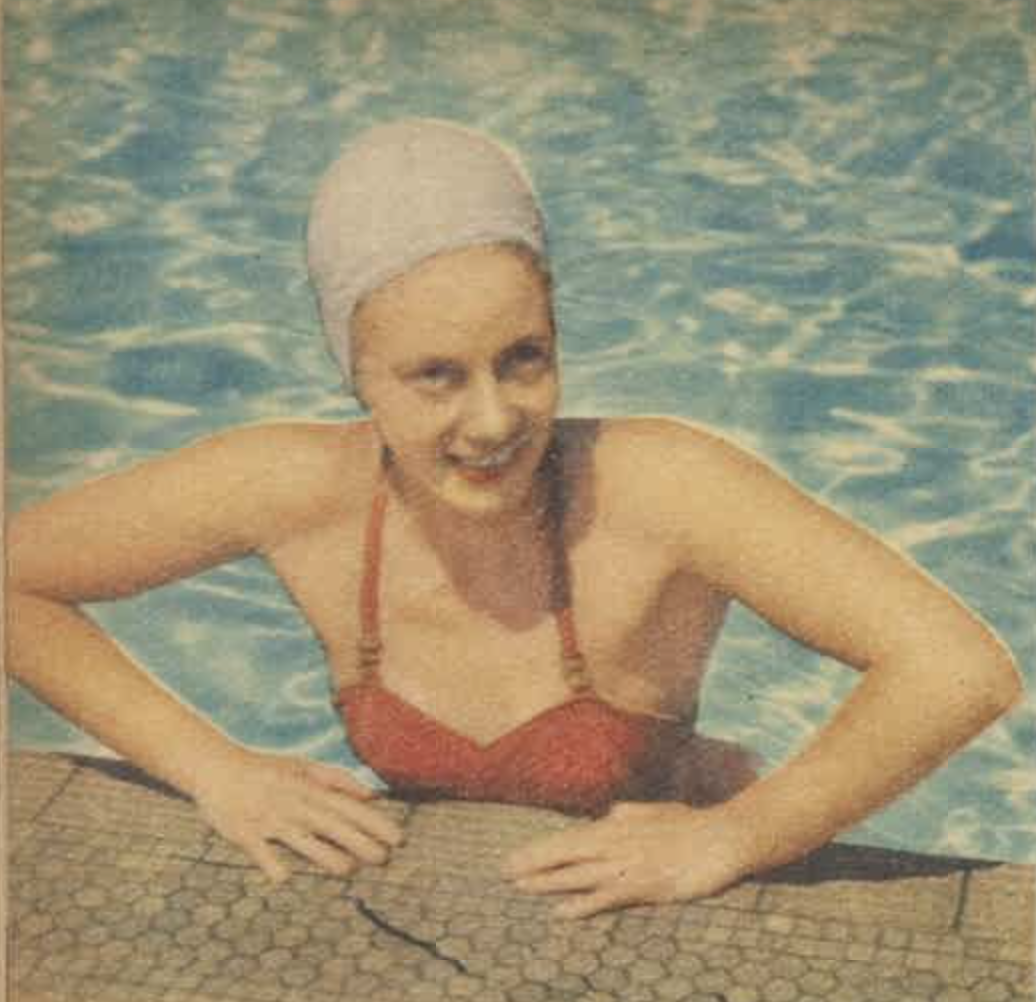
Barbara McAulay

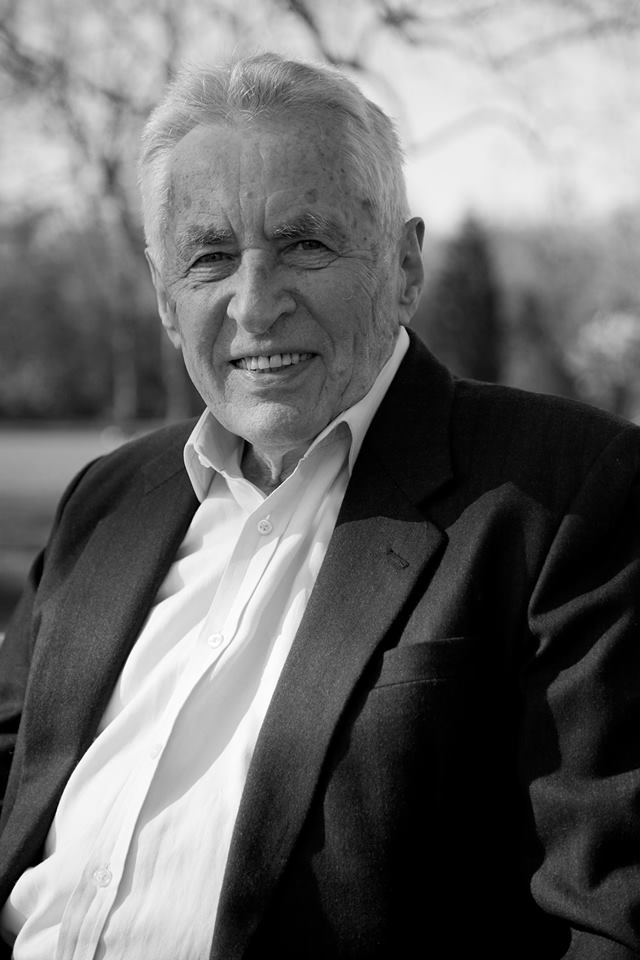
George Mikell

- 15 March – Barbara McAulay, Olympic diver (d. 2020)
- 18 March – Ted Robertson, Northern Territory politician (d. 1991)
- 19 March – Olive Zakharov, Victorian politician (d. 1995)
- 24 March – Bryant Burns, Queensland politician (d. 2007)
- 28 March
  - Paul England, racing driver (d. 2014)
  - Keith Johnson, Victorian politician (d. 1995)
- 31 March – Don Candy, tennis player (d. 2020)
- 2 April – Pat Twomey, Australian rules footballer (Collingwood) (d. 1969)
- 4 April – George Mikell, actor and writer (born in Lithuania) (d. 2020)
- 9 April
  - Ron Haddrick, cricketer and actor (d. 2020)
  - Fred Hollows, ophthalmologist (born in New Zealand) (d. 1993)
- 17 April – Allen Blanchard, Western Australian politician (born in the United Kingdom) (d. 2008)
- 25 April – Don Fish, graphic designer, illustrator, cartoonist, poster designer and writer (d. 2021)
- 29 April
  - Maxwell Newton, media publisher (d. 1990)
  - Peter Sculthorpe, composer (d. 2014)
- 30 April
  - Irving Davidson, Australian rules footballer (St Kilda) (d. 2022)
  - Carl Kirkwood, Victorian politician (born in the United Kingdom) (d. 2020)

=== May - June ===
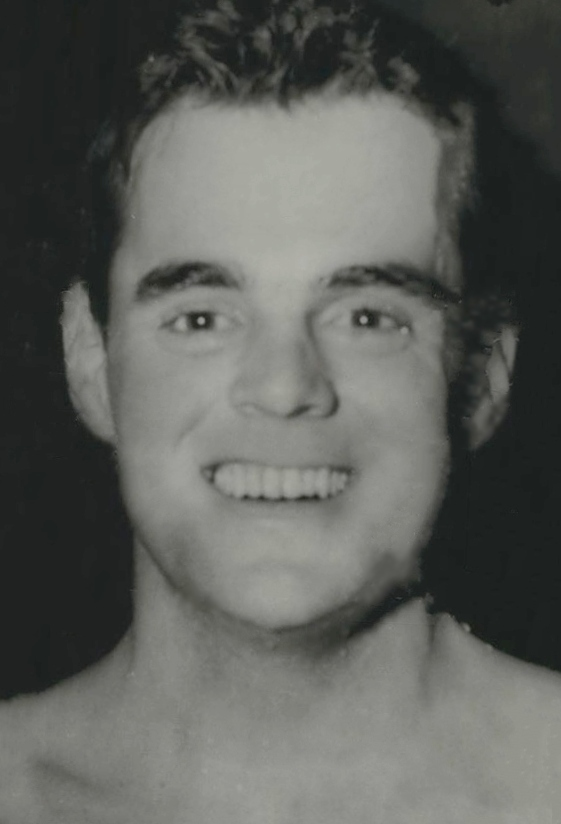
John Davies

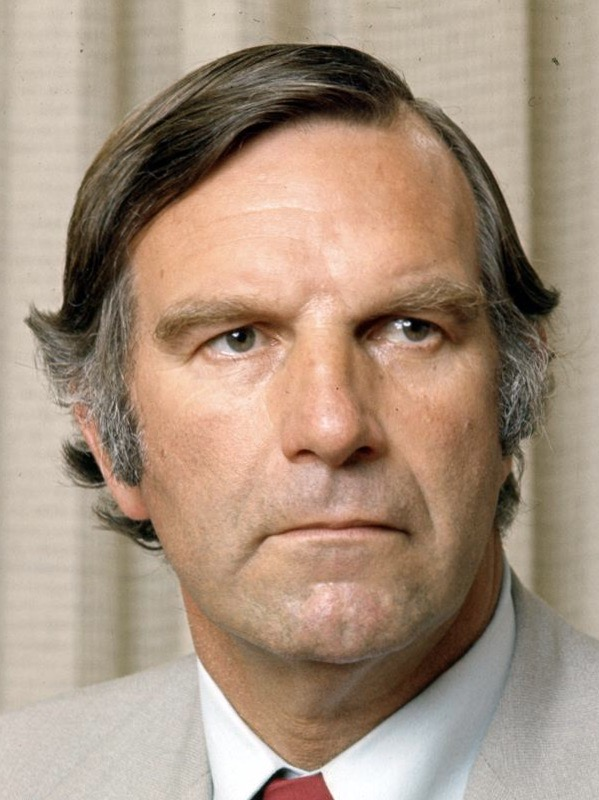
Ian Sinclair

- 4 May – Ella Stack, doctor and Lord Mayor of Darwin (d. 2023)
- 7 May
  - Len Fitzgerald, Australian rules footballer (Collingwood) (d. 2007)
  - John Holt, New South Wales politician and judge (d. 2012)
- 10 May – Geoffrey Burnstock, neurobiologist (born in the United Kingdom) (d. 2020)
- 11 May – Alan Daly, Australian rules footballer (Melbourne) (d. 2021)
- 13 May – Ivan Lund, fencer (d. 1992)
- 15 May – Kevin Cairns, Queensland politician (d. 1984)
- 17 May – John Davies, Olympic swimmer and judge (d. 2020)
- 24 May – Brian Wenzel, actor (d. 2024)
- 26 May
  - Ernie Carroll, television personality (d. 2022)
  - Hans Freeman, bioinorganic chemist (born in Germany) (d. 2008)
- 2 June – Ken McGregor, tennis player (d. 2007)
- 3 June – Gordon Simpson, Queensland politician (d. 2017)
- 9 June – Tom McNeil, Western Australian politician and Australian rules footballer (St. Kilda) (born in the United Kingdom) (d. 2020)
- 10 June – Ian Sinclair, 7th Leader of the National Party
- 12 June – Roy Bull, rugby league footballer and coach (d. 2004)
- 13 June – Kevin Harrold, New South Wales politician (d. 2012)
- 14 June – Alan Davidson, cricketer (d. 2021)
- 15 June – Geoffrey Parsons, pianist (d. 1995)
- 17 June – George Brenner, New South Wales politician (born in Hungary) (d. 2021)
- 23 June – Herb Barker, athlete (d. 2006)
- 26 June – June Bronhill, opera singer (d. 2005)

=== July - August ===
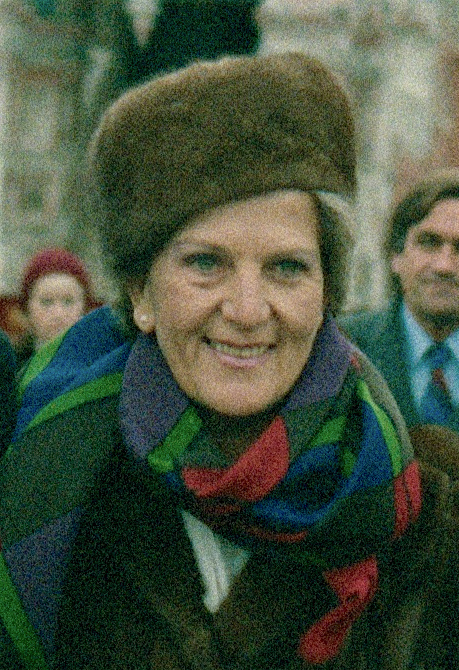
Hazel Hawke

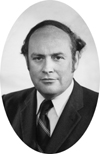
David Tonkin

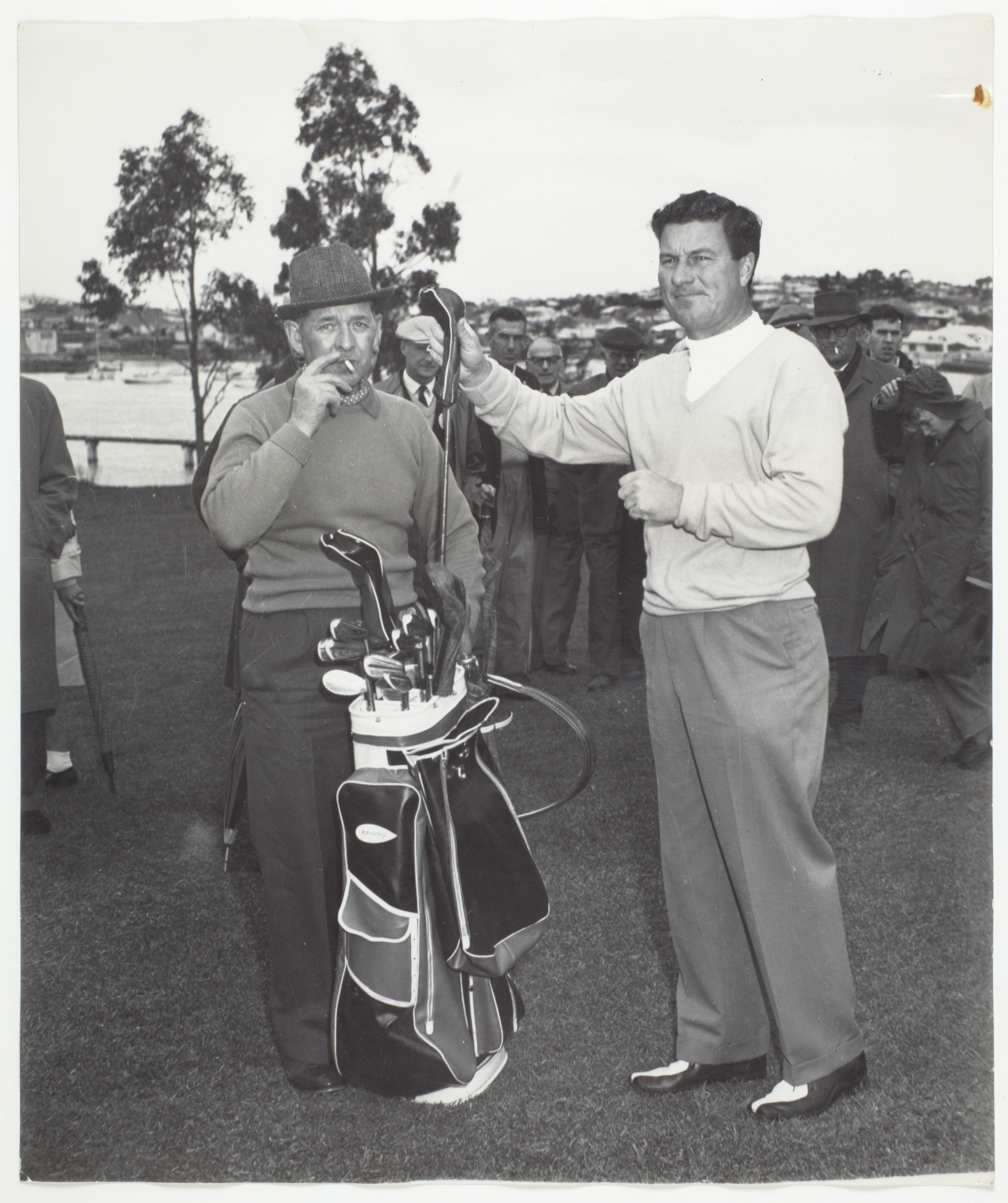
Peter Thomson

- 1 July – Jack Storey, Australian rules footballer (Footscray)
- 4 July – Max Olding, pianist (d. 2021)
- 5 July
  - Jimmy Carruthers, boxer (d. 1990)
  - Ron Casey, sports journalist and radio personality (d. 2018)
- 6 July – Russell Middlemiss, Australian rules footballer (Geelong) (d. 2019)
- 8 July – Bruce Gyngell, television executive (d. 2000)
- 12 July
  - Barry Griffiths, Australian rules footballer (Hawthorn)
  - Ken Hannam, film and television director (d. 2004)
  - Bill Nolan, Australian rules footballer (South Melbourne) (d. 2019)
- 14 July – Adam Inglis, Australian rules footballer (Carlton) (d. 2023)
- 17 July – Roger Goldsworthy, 3rd Deputy Premier of South Australia (d. 2025)
- 20 July
  - Hazel Hawke, 22nd Spouse of the Prime Minister of Australia (d. 2013)
  - David Tonkin, 38th Premier of South Australia (d. 2000)
- 21 July – Jim Bailey, Olympic athlete (d. 2020)
- 25 July – Ron Lord, soccer player (d. 2024)
- 27 July – Marc Wilkinson, composer and conductor (born in France) (d. 2022)
- 5 August – Reg Lindsay, country music singer (d. 2008)
- 6 August – Thomas Ahearn, Queensland politician (d. 2021)
- 9 August – John Wheeldon, Western Australian politician (d. 2006)
- 12 August
  - John Bluthal, actor (born in Poland) (d. 2018)
  - Manfred Cross, Queensland politician (d. 2024)
- 14 August – Derek Fielding, librarian and author (born in the United Kingdom) (d. 2014)
- 16 August – William Copeland, Test cricket umpire (d. 2011)
- 21 August
  - Brian Archer, Tasmanian politician (d. 2013)
  - Jack Gaffney, Australian rules footballer (Fitzroy) and lawyer (d. 2018)
- 23 August – Peter Thomson, golfer (d. 2018)
- 25 August – Seaman Dan, musician (d. 2020)
- 30 August – Gordon Barton, businessman and political activist (born in the Dutch East Indies) (d. 2005)

=== September - October ===
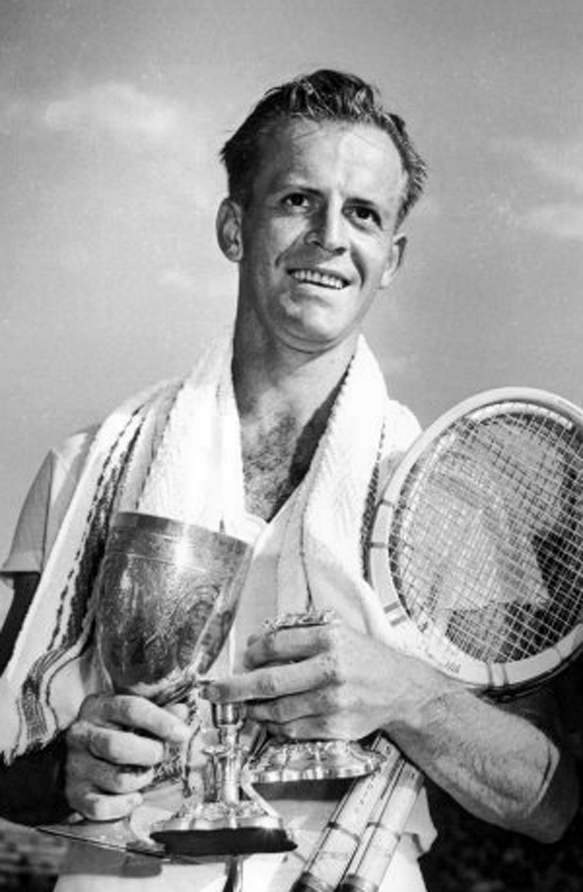
Rex Hartwig

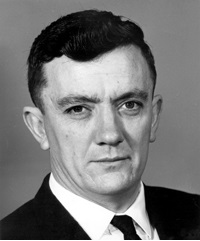
Wal Fife

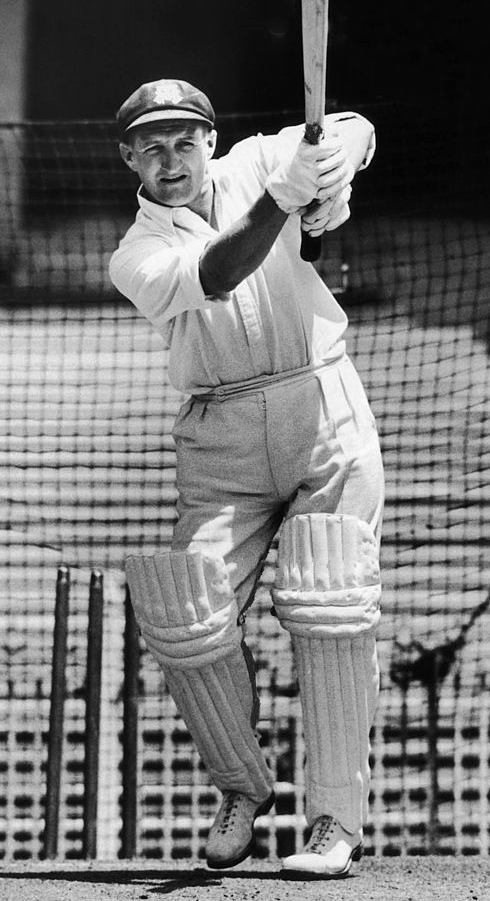
Les Favell

- 2 September
  - Tom Allsop, Australian rules footballer (Hawthorn) (d. 2019)
  - Rex Hartwig, tennis player (d. 2022)
- 3 September – John Vernon, high jumper (d. 2019)
- 4 September – Bruce Murray, Australian rules footballer (South Melbourne) and cricketer (d. 2020)
- 5 September – Margaret Loutit, microbiologist (d. 2020)
- 8 September – Neil Robbins, athlete (d. 2020)
- 15 September
  - Eva Burrows, 13th General of The Salvation Army (d. 2015)
  - Peter Watkins, New South Wales politician
- 21 September – Dick Tooth, rugby union player (d. 2020)
- 25 September – John Rutherford, cricketer (d. 2022)
- 26 September – Brian Oliver, long and triple jumper (d. 2015)
- 27 September
  - William Bridges-Maxwell, New South Wales politician (d. 1992)
  - Ken McCaffery, rugby league footballer and commentator (d. 2021)
- 1 October – Ken Arthurson, rugby league footballer, coach and administrator
- 2 October
  - Lorrae Desmond, actress, singer and television presenter (d. 2021)
  - Wal Fife, New South Wales politician and businessman (d. 2017)
- 6 October – Les Favell, cricketer (d. 1987)
- 8 October – Gracia Baylor, Victorian politician (d. 2025)
- 12 October – John Bourchier, Victorian politician (d. 2017)
- 13 October – Kevin Hallett, Olympic swimmer (d. 2021)
- 15 October – John Solomon, rugby union player (d. 2020)
- 17 October – Jack Mundey, New South Wales councillor, trade union leader and environmental activist (d. 2020)
- 20 October – Stroma Buttrose, architect (d. 2020)
- 21 October – Glen Sheil, Queensland politician and tennis player (d. 2008)
- 31 October – Eddie Charlton, snooker and billiards player (d. 2004)

=== November - December ===
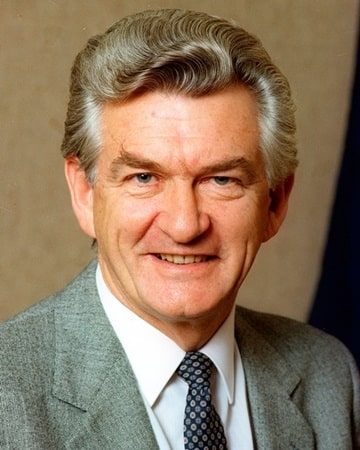
Bob Hawke

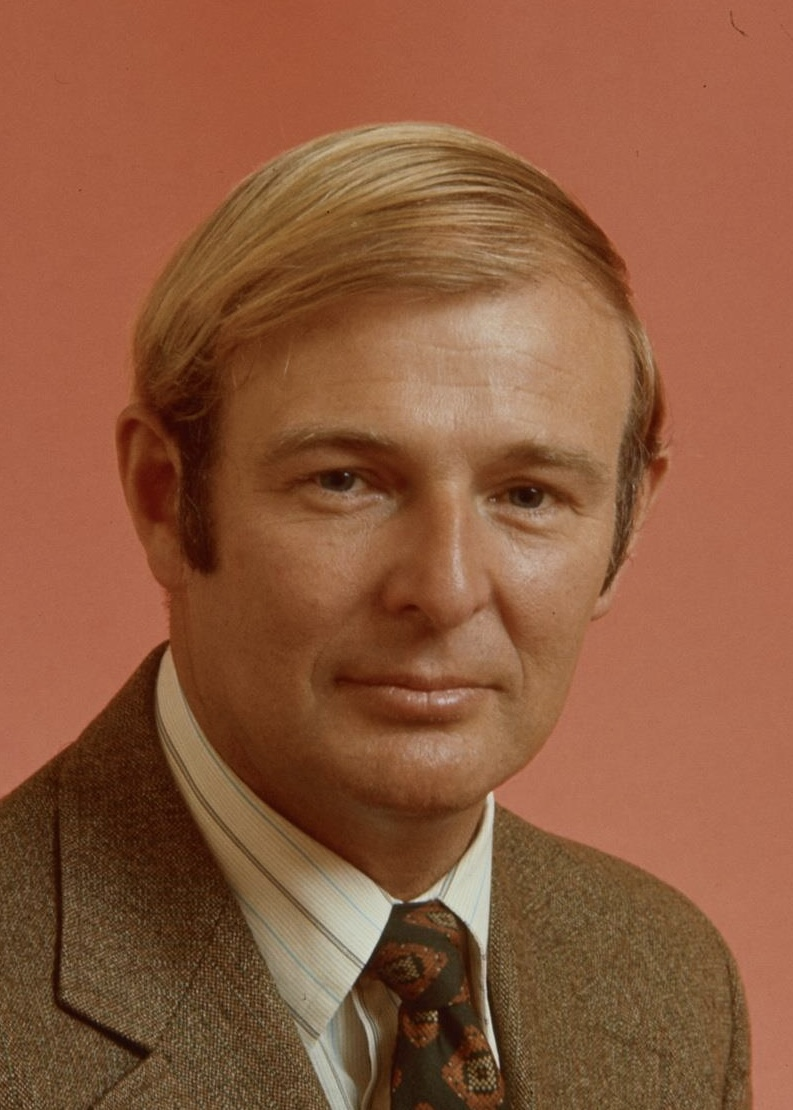
Doug Anthony

- 4 November – Jeannette Patrick, Victorian politician (d. 2011)
- 6 November – Ronald Raines, New South Wales politician
- 10 November – Ray Preston, rugby league player (Newtown Jets) (d. 2019)
- 16 November – David Arblaster, New South Wales politician (d. 2006)
- 17 November – Andy Thorpe, model and radio personality (d. 2010)
- 17 November – Alan Cameron, rugby union player (d. 2010)
- 22 November – Keith Rayner, Anglican bishop (d. 2025)
- 23 November
  - Bill Henderson, soccer player
  - Peter Lucas, Australian rules footballer (Collingwood) (d. 2019)
  - Bruce Petty, political satirist (d. 2023)
- 4 December
  - John Fethers, fencer (d. 2010)
  - Sir Noel Power, Chief Justice of the Supreme Court of Hong Kong (d. 2009)
- 9 December – Bob Hawke, 23rd Prime Minister of Australia and President of the ACTU (d. 2019)
- 11 December
  - Laurence Harding-Smith, fencer (d. 2021)
  - Desmond O'Grady, journalist, author and playwright (d. 2021)
- 18 December – Bob Jane, racing driver and businessman (d. 2018)
- 21 December – Joyce Evans, photographer (d. 2019)
- 31 December – Doug Anthony, 2nd Deputy Prime Minister of Australia (d. 2020)

== Deaths ==
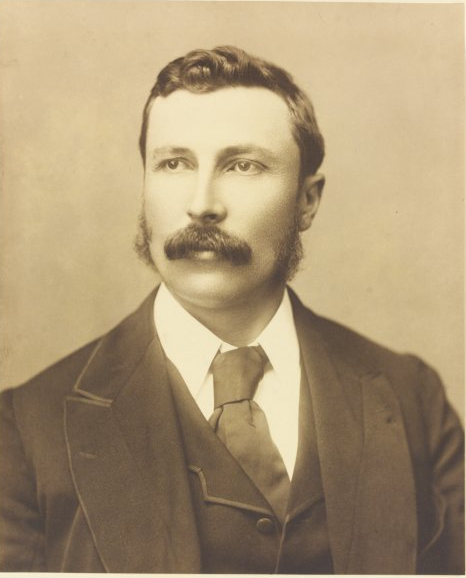
Sir John Cockburn

- 13 January – H. B. Higgins, Victorian politician, lawyer, and High Court justice (b. 1851)
- 16 February – Thomas Kennedy, Victorian politician (b. 1860)
- 20 February – James McColl, Victorian politician (born in the United Kingdom) (b. 1844)
- 28 April – May Jordan McConnel, trade unionist and suffragist (died in the United States) (b. 1860)
- 17 May – Edward Harney, Western Australian politician and lawyer (born in Ireland and died in the United Kingdom) (b. 1865)
- 7 June – Alfred Waldron, Australian rules footballer (Carlton) (b. 1857)
- 26 June – Samuel Cooke, Victorian politician (died in the United Kingdom) (b. 1847)
- 14 July – Sir Walter Baldwin Spencer, evolutionary biologist, anthropologist, and ethnologist (born in the United Kingdom and died in Chile) (b. 1860)
- 7 August – Sir Alexander Matheson, 3rd Baronet, Western Australian politician (born and died in the United Kingdom) (d. 1929)
- 25 August – Frederick Burton, cricketer (died in New Zealand) (b. 1865)
- 11 September – Archibald James Campbell, public servant, ornithologist and naturalist (b. 1853)
- 30 October – Franc Falkiner, New South Wales politician and grazier (b. 1867)
- 26 November – Sir John Cockburn, 18th Premier of South Australia (b. 1850)

== See also ==
- List of Australian films of the 1920s
