= White Glove =

White Glove may refer to:

- "White Glove", a song by Dove Cameron from Alchemical: Volume 1 (2023)
- The White Glove, a 1921 portrait painting by Australian artist George Washington Lambert
- The White Gloves, a 1951 Iranian film
- White glove sale, a type of auction
