= Barry Griffiths =

Barry Griffiths may refer to:

- Barri Griffiths, ring name of Mason Ryan (born 1982), Welsh wrestler and former Gladiators competitor
- Barry Griffiths (Australian footballer) (born 1929), Australian rules footballer
- Barry Griffiths (footballer, born 1940), association football goalkeeper
- Barry Griffiths (table tennis) (born 1964), New Zealand table tennis player
- Barry Griffiths (violinist) (1939–2020), British violinist
