= Adam Inglis =

Adam Inglis may refer to:

- Adam Inglis (footballer), Australian rules footballer
- Sir Adam Inglis, 3rd Baronet of the Inglis baronets
