= The White Glove =

1921 painting by George Washington Lambert

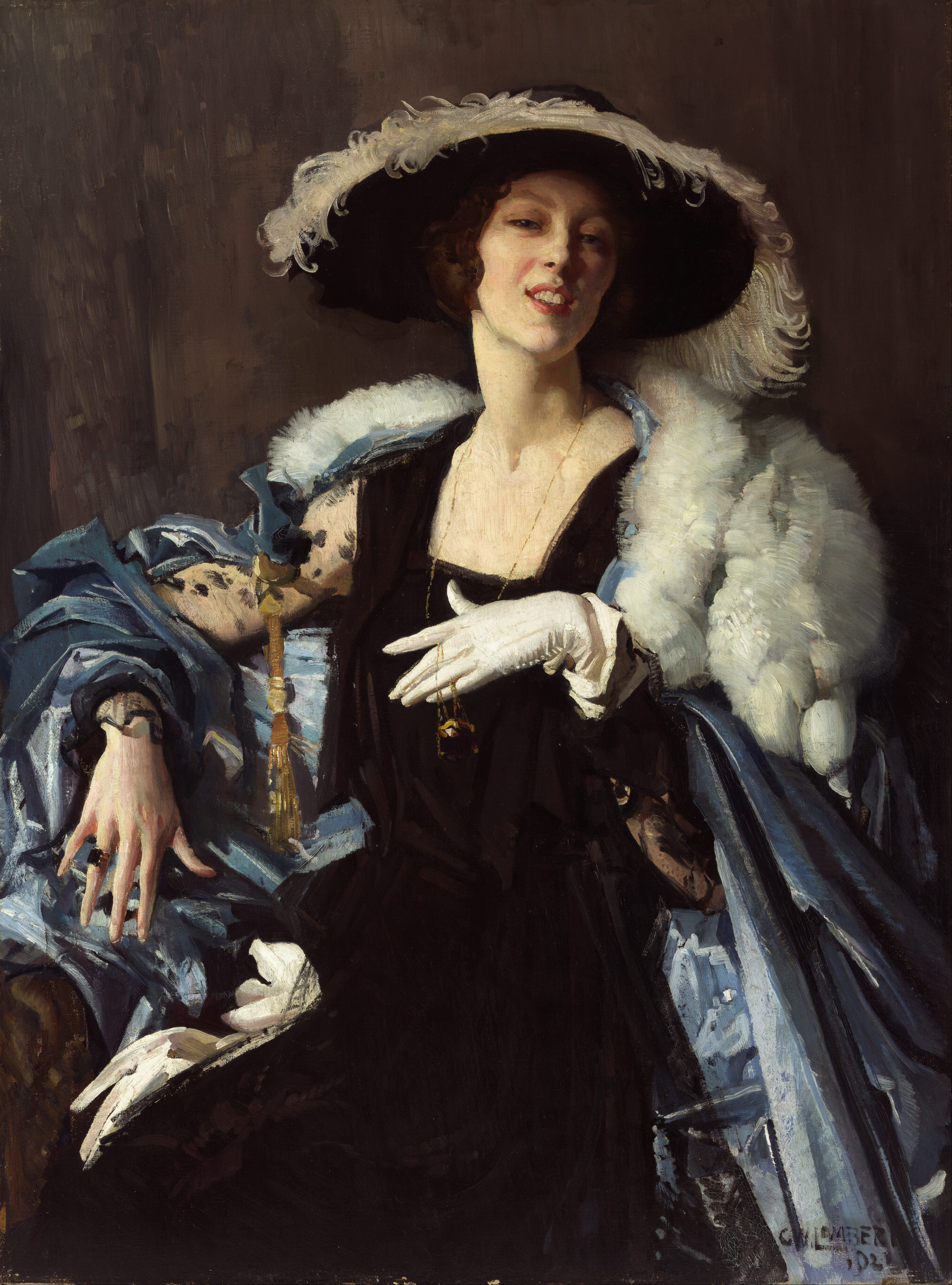
- Artist: George Washington Lambert
- Year: 1921
- Medium: oil on canvas
- Dimensions: 106.0 cm × 78.0 cm (41.7 in × 30.7 in)
- Location: Art Gallery of New South Wales; Sydney

The White Glove is a 1921 portrait painting by Australian artist George Washington Lambert. The painting depicts Miss Gladys Neville Collins, the daughter of J.T. Collins, lawyer, Victorian State Parliamentary draughtsman, and trustee of the Public Library, Museums and National Gallery of Victoria.

Lambert posed the subject in a manner suggestive of Joshua Reynolds Sarah Siddons as the Tragic Muse. The painting also suggests Lambert was familiar with John Singer Sargent's 1905 work Portrait of Ena Wertheimer: a vele gonfie.

Miss Collins’s tilted head, her half-open mouth, half-closed eyes, and almost-bare right arm suggest an individual sensuality, but they also indicate a form of codified (sexual) behaviour.

— Art Gallery of New South Wales,

Lambert's lively work was significantly different from the "prevalent brown tonalist portraiture" in vogue with other Australian portrait painters at the time. In a letter to his wife Amy, Lambert described the painting as a "wild dashing portrait".

The painting was acquired for 600 guineas by the Art Gallery of New South Wales in 1922, at the time the highest price paid by a public gallery for a portrait by an Australian artist. The work remains part of its collection.

== See also ==
- Miss Collins, a 1924 painting by William Beckwith McInnes of Gladys Neville Collins
