= Miss Collins =

1924 painting by William Beckwith McInnes

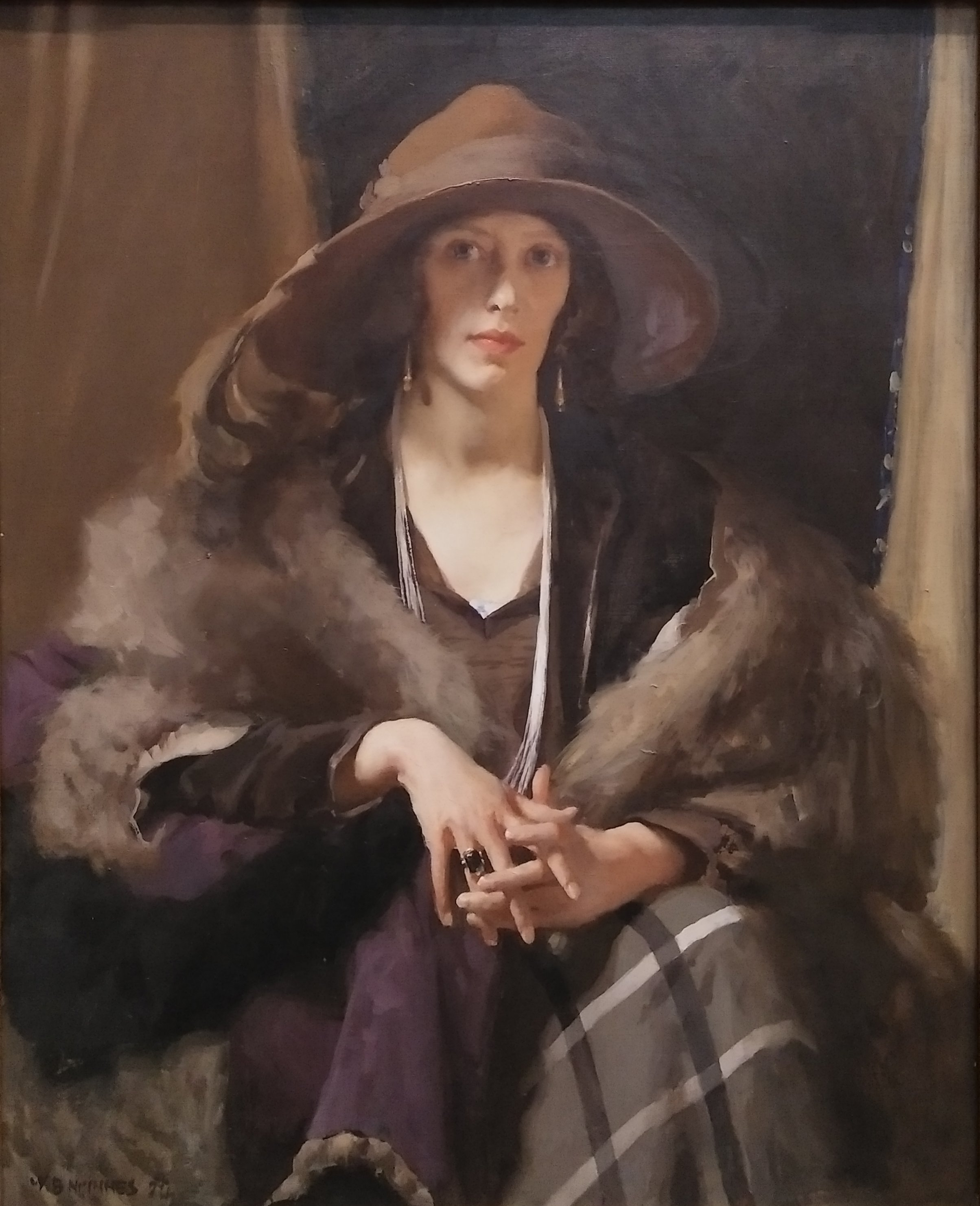
- Artist: William Beckwith McInnes
- Year: 1924
- Medium: oil on canvas
- Dimensions: 91.4 cm × 73.6 cm (36.0 in × 29.0 in)
- Location: Art Gallery of South Australia; Adelaide
- Website: https://www.agsa.sa.gov.au/collection-publications/collection/works/miss-collins/24167/

Miss Collins is a 1924 portrait painting by Australian artist William Beckwith McInnes. The painting depicts Miss Gladys Neville Collins, the daughter of J.T. Collins, lawyer, Victorian State Parliamentary draughtsman, and trustee of the Public Library, Museums and National Gallery of Victoria.

The painting was awarded the 1924 Archibald Prize.

The subject of his painting ... is shown to be stylish, elegant and restrained. Close attention is paid to details of clothing and jewellery, while the shawl is handled with expressive, broad brushstrokes.

— National Gallery of Australia,

The painting was acquired by the Art Gallery of South Australia in 1930 through the Morgan Thomas Bequest Fund and remains part of its collection.

== See also ==
- The White Glove, a 1921 painting by George Washington Lambert of Gladys Neville Collins
