= Interspel =

English spelling reform

Interspel, or International English Spelling, is a set of principles introduced by Valerie Yule that aims to address the unpredictability and inconsistency of present English spelling, while preserving its heritage of print through minimal changes in appearance.

Interspel seeks to maximize the advantages of present spelling for users and learners by applying psychological research on their needs and abilities, facilitating both visual and auditory reading processes, and taking into account the special features of the English language. This approach also promotes visible relationships between English and international vocabulary.

Principles for systematization are used to reduce present disadvantages. Interspel uses a phonemic spelling for beginners and includes dictionary pronunciation guides as a base that can be modified. Such a combination of advantages has been thought to be impossible. However, psychological and linguistic research, as well as technological advances, make such a systematic reforum more feasible, including innovations that go against the usual proposals for spelling reform.

== Levels ==
Interspel-style reform, still in process of development and testing, has the following four levels for learning and use:

1. The alphabetic principle of sound-symbol correspondence, for beginner learners and for dictionary pronunciation keys. The correspondence is diaphonic, that is, broad and conventionalized so that dialect variations are subsumed, as in the spellings dog and banana, and it represents clear formal speech, not casual slurring.
2. Learners immediately move on to an unexpected feature of this reform, as they learn the irregular spellings of around thirty of the hundred most common words which make up about half of everyday text. This dramatically retains half of the appearance of present print, and assists learners to start reading the print around them.
3. Learners progressively move into reading and writing adult text with applied morphemic principles, such as consistent -s/es and -d/ed spellings for plural and tense endings. Only a few differentiated spellings of homophones prove needful. Doubled consonants can show irregular stress. Transitional features include personal choice for the spelling of names and recognizing for reading but not needed for writing, eight one-way-pronunciation alternative spellings for vowels and alternative pronunciations of three consonants for reading. This ‘Spelling without traps for reading’ then closely resembles existing English spelling, which it has made more consistent.
4. Learners are directed to an internet forum and given instruction to spot spelling, grammar and punctuation and then correct them.

In this way, readers accustomed to present spelling are not inconvenienced. Writers, including poor spellers, can use the predictable spellings that can be accepted as alternative spellings in dictionaries until usage determines public preference. The first principle for present spellers can be to omit surplus letters in words that serve no purpose to represent meaning or pronunciation, and can often mislead. This streamlining trend is already occurring, especially in text messaging.

The English spelling reform based on Interspel envisages an International English Spelling Commission to monitor research and authorize testing and implementation of findings.

== Consistency principles ==
Summary of the principles for making English spelling more consistent, as applied in the experimental form Interspel:

1. Retain the spelling of the most common hundred words, which make up about half of everyday text. 31 of these have irregular spelling: all, almost, always, among, are, come, some, could, should, would, half, know, of, off, one, only, once, other, pull, push, put, as, was, what, want, who, why, and international word endings -ion/-tion/-ssion plus -zion, as in question, passion, vizion.

2. Regard spelling as a standardized conventionalized representation of the language (not merely its sounds), set out as in formal speech with minimal slurring.

3. Apply the alphabetic principle of systematic sound-symbol correspondence, including regularizing current spelling patterns for final vowels, as in pity, may, be, hi-fi, go, emu, spa, her, hair, for, saw, cow, boy, too.

The primary vowels letters ‘a’, ‘e’, ‘i’, ‘o’, and ‘u’ are used to spell both 'long' and 'short' vowels, distinguishing long vowels as necessary by a diacritic (grave accent) as in national/nàtion, repetition/repèt, finish/fìnal, consolàtion/consòl, and consumtion/consùmer. The remaining vowel sounds are spelled as in car, perturb (ur = stressed, er = unstressed), hair, fort, taut, round, boil, boot, and, still unsolved, spelling for the vowel sound with no spelling of its own, as in book (perhaps as buuk).

Sequences of vowels can then be represented very simply in Interspel. Accents for learners are optional. 'Spelling for reading' vowel spellings are included below:

a – bazaar, pàella, dàis, (paid), càos, taut,
e – idèa, (year), (meet), bèing, crèol, hidèus
i – dìal, dìet, flìing, ìota, pìus
o – òasis, (boat), pòet, gòing, (boil), Zoo/zòolojy, out
u – dùal, sùet, flùid, dùo, inocùus.

Doubled consonants have only three purposes: to indicate irregular stress; rr for short vowels as in carrot and current, and possibly final /ss/ for nouns.

4. This alphabetic base that relates letters to English speech sounds is modified with morphemic principles that represent grammar and meaning visually, as in plural and tense endings –s/es and –d/ed.

5. Only a few sets of words that sound the same (homophones) are found to be so confusable that they need differentiated spellings.

6. Names and places can be spelled as they please.

7. Seven alternative vowel spellings with one-way pronunciation for reading: ai, ea, ee, igh, oa, ew, ir; and two possible pronunciations each for th, c, g and y, can also be recognized at the level of ‘Spelling for reading without traps’. Nobody has to memorize these alternative spellings to use in their own writing.

The seven principles above are proposed for investigation. They offer a feasible way to prevent English spelling remaining a serious barrier to literacy. They change only around 2.6% of the letters in everyday text, so present readers would be hardly inconvenienced. Its more consistent visible relationship of related words regularizes the 'Chomsky' features of English spelling, to promote faster automatic visual recognition in reading for meaning and a more predictable relationship to the spoken language for international users and learners.

== Example ==
An extract from H.G. Wells' ‘The Star’, often used by spelling reformers, is given in two levels of Interspel.

(a) Interspel ‘Spelling without traps for reading’:

It was on the first day of the new year that the announcement was made, almòst simultàneusly from three observatorys, that the mòtion of the planet Neptùne, the outermòst of all the planets that wheel about the Sun, had become very erratic. a retardàtion in its velocity had been suspected in December. Then a faint, remòte speck of light was discovered in the règion of the perturbed planet. At first this did not caus eny very gràt exìtement. sìentific pèpl, however, found the intelligence remarkabl enuf, èven befor it became known that the new body was rapidly gròwing larger and brìghter, and that its mòtion was quìte different from the orderly prògress of the planets.

(b) The basic Interspel spelling for beginners with morphemic modifications, and 31 retained irregularly spelled words:

It was on the furst day of the new yèar that the anounsment was màd, almòst simultàneusly from thrè obsurvatorys, that the mòtion of the planet Neptùn, the outermòst of all the planets that whèl about the Sun, had become very erattic. a retardàtion in its velossity had bèn suspected in Desember. Then a fànt, remòt spek of lìt was discovered in the rèjon of the perturbd planet. At furst this did not cauz eny very gràt exìtment. sìentific pèpl, however, found the intellijens remarkabl enuf, èven befor it becàm known that the nù body was rapidly gròing larjer and brìter, and that its mòtion was quìt difrent from the orderly prògres of the planets.

Here is another Interspel example.

We may nowadays be chary about ùsing the word "gènius", but we still have a good idèa what is ment by it. For exampal, there are graet numbers of very gifted miùsicians who are admird but not calld gèniuses. But there are others, manifestly prodijius, performing offen at extraordinarily erly àjes, a variety of feats so complex that the miùsical layman could hardly imajin, èven with the mòst desperat làbor, accomplishing eny of them, while èven miùsicians are astonishd and we then reach for the good, handy, vaeg Enlaitenment werd and call them gèniuses. The list includes Mozart and Mendelssohn; and, despite all the limiting jujments, it includes Benjamin Britten.
- Frank Kermode, 'Britten when yung'

== Comparison with other English spelling reform proposals ==
By way of comparison, other proposals for English spelling reform are of four types:

- New alphabets, such as the Shavian alphabet or the Deseret Alphabet;
- Including new symbols so that all English sounds have one 'letter' each, as in Pitman's Initial teaching alphabet or Unifon;
- Phonemic, with correspondence of graphemes and phonemes (letters and sounds) such as Rondthaler's American Spelling (SoundSpel), the Simplified Spelling Society's Nue Spelling, or the Basic Roman spelling of English. The 'long' vowels cause the greatest difficulty;
- Lists of re-spellings with or without rules, such as the SR1.

Interspel, however, is a systematic reform of present spelling with three levels, to match established needs and abilities of users and learners, in which the basic alphabetic principle is modified by morphemic principles, long and short vowels are visibly related, and the 31 most common irregular words are retained. It is more complex in design, but more practicable in use.

Until there is a breakthrough to an international script that can cross languages, like Chinese, Interspel proposes an improved spelling for English, the world's present lingua franca that could be essential for wider literacy and global communication. The International English Spelling Commission envisaged by this language reform proposal would oversee and monitor informal and formal experimental research in English spelling improvement, and to implement the outcomes.

== See also ==
- Spelling reform
- English spelling reform
- List of some English spelling reform proposals
- Valerie Yule
