= Stroma Buttrose =

Australian architect (1929–2020)

Stroma Buttrose (20 October 1929 – 26 February 2020) was an Australian architect, who became the first female Planning Assistant in South Australia, joining the Town Planners Office in 1957 (later called the State Planning office). Buttrose is considered to be a pioneering figure of women in architecture, as she was the first female Commissioner of the Planning Appeal Board, as well as being the author of numerous architectural publications, most notably City Planning in Australia in 1975.

Buttrose supervised the Gawler Land Use Survey, as well as the Willunga Land Use Survey, both areas covering approximately 100 by 40 kilometres. She was also instrumental in the production of the Development Plan for the Metropolitan Area of Adelaide, which was published in 1963. In 1973, Buttrose was the first woman to be appointed Commissioner of the Town Planning Appeal Board/Tribunal, which later became the Environment, Resources and Development Court.

== Early life ==
Buttrose's interest in geography, and later town planning, began at school in Hopetoun, and later Woolands at Glenelg. At the University of Adelaide, she completed her Diploma in Arts and Education. At 21, Buttrose travelled to Europe with her family and, upon her return, she taught Geography while she completed a Bachelor of Arts degree, with a major in Geography. Buttrose was appointed temporary female draftsman's assistant to the government town planner in April 1957. In 1962 Buttrose completed the Master of Town Planning Degree at Adelaide University with Professor Rolf Jensen (part of the RJA group), in a class of only ten students.
