= Jack Gaffney =

Australian rules footballer (1929–2018)

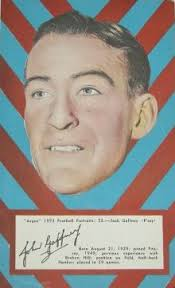

Personal information
- Full name: John Bernard Gaffney
- Born: 21 August 1929
- Died: 1 August 2018 (aged 88)
- Original teams: Broken Hill YCW / South Broken Hill
- Height: 182 cm (6 ft 0 in)
- Weight: 81 kg (179 lb)
- Position: Halfback

Playing career^{1}
Years	Club	Games (Goals)
1949–53	Fitzroy	80 (0)
- ^{1} Playing statistics correct to the end of 1953.

John Bernard "Jack" Gaffney OAM (21 August 1929 – 1 August 2018) was an Australian rules footballer who played with Fitzroy in the Victorian Football League (VFL).

Originally from Broken Hill, Gaffney played for and coached Prahran in the Victorian Football Association (VFA) after retiring from the VFL. He later became a lawyer, and was the Supreme Court of Victoria Registrar of Criminal Appeals, a Master; and Registrar of the Court of Appeal. He also served on the VFL Tribunal.
