= Bruce Murray (sportsman) =

Australian sportsman (1929–2020)

Personal information
- Full name: William Walter Bruce Murray
- Born: 4 September 1929; Mildura, Victoria, Australia
- Died: 16 April 2020 (aged 90); Queensland, Australia
- Height: 178 cm (5 ft 10 in)
- Weight: 70 kg (154 lb)

Playing career^{1}
Years	Club	Games (Goals)
1951–54	South Melbourne	44 (6)
- ^{1} Playing statistics correct to the end of 1954.

William Walter Bruce Murray (4 September 1929 – 16 April 2020) was an Australian rules footballer who played with South Melbourne in the Victorian Football League (VFL) during the early 1950s. He also played as a first-class cricketer for Victoria.

Murray was a regular in the South Melbourne team for the 1951 and 1952 VFL seasons and received three Brownlow votes in the latter. In 1953 he struggled to keep his spot in the side and after managing just one senior game the following year, left the club and turned to cricket.

While handy with the bat, Murray was primarily a right-arm medium pace bowler and made four first-class appearances in the Sheffield Shield with Victoria, for a return of nine wickets at 36.88. All his matches came in the 1957/58 competition and in one, against Western Australia, he dismissed Test cricketers Ken Meuleman and Barry Shepherd. Murray was also a prolific all-rounder for the Prahran Cricket Club, for whom he scored over 5000 runs at 24.0 and took a record 426 wickets at 19.5 over twenty seasons.

== See also ==
- List of Victoria first-class cricketers
