= Bill Nolan (footballer, born 1929) =

Australian rules footballer (1929–2019)

Personal information
- Full name: William Richard Nolan
- Born: 12 July 1929
- Died: 10 January 2019 (aged 89)
- Original team: South Districts
- Height: 185 cm (6 ft 1 in)
- Weight: 76 kg (168 lb)

Playing career^{1}
Years	Club	Games (Goals)
1952–55	South Melbourne	19 (14)
- ^{1} Playing statistics correct to the end of 1955.

William Richard Nolan (12 July 1929 – 10 January 2019) was an Australian rules footballer who played with South Melbourne in the Victorian Football League (VFL).
