= John Longstaff =

Australian painter and war artist

Sir John Longstaff
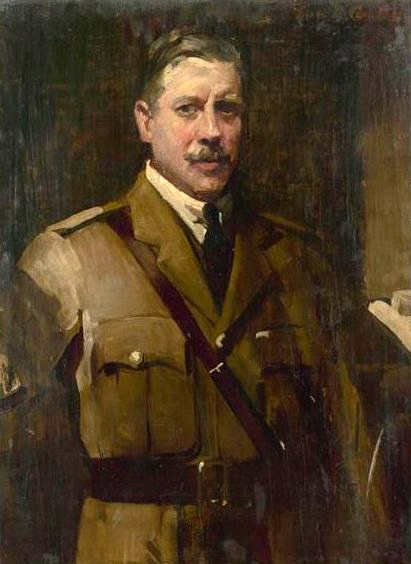
- Portrait of Longstaff by George Coates, 1918, National Library of Australia
- Born: John Campbell Longstaff; 10 March 1861; Clunes, Victoria
- Died: 1 October 1941 (aged 80); Melbourne, Victoria, Australia
- Known for: Painting
- Awards: Knight Bachelor

Sir John Campbell Longstaff (10 March 1861 – 1 October 1941) was an Australian painter, war artist and a five-time winner of the Archibald Prize for portraiture. Longstaff was one of the most prolific portraitists of the Edwardian period, painting many high society figures in both Australia and Britain.

His cousin Will Longstaff was also a painter and war artist.

== Biography ==
=== Early life and education ===
Longstaff was born at Clunes, Victoria, second son of Ralph Longstaff, storekeeper and Janet (Jessie) Campbell. John was educated at a boarding school in Miners Rest and Clunes State School. He studied between 1883 and 1887 at the Melbourne National Gallery School where, despite his father's initial disapproval of his artistic ambitions, Longstaff's talent was recognised by George Folingsby.

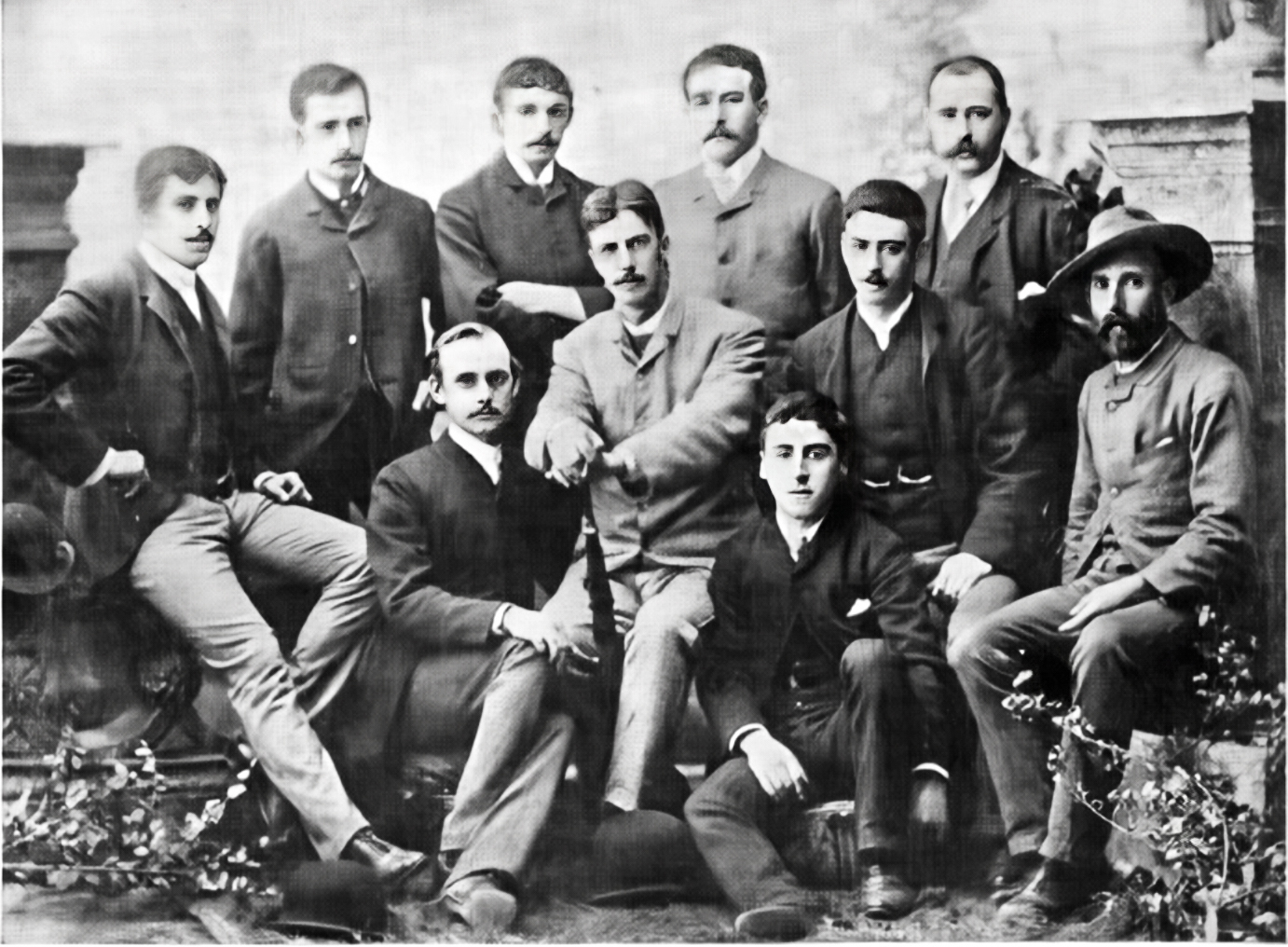
Longstaff (far left) with other members of the Buonarotti Club

In May 1883, he was a founding member of the bohemian artists' society the Buonarotti Club with, among others, Alexander Colquhoun and Tom Humphrey. That month, French painter Jules Lefebvre's controversial 1875 nude Chloé was being shown in Victoria's National Gallery, and the Sunday Observance League objected to the trustees' decision to exhibit the painting on the Sabbath. When it was covered with a black curtain, Longstaff, with eight other Gallery School students, three of whom were fellow Buonarotti Club members (Colquhoun, Frederick McCubbin and Louis Abrahams), wrote a letter to the press in protest. Longstaff occasionally joined other Buonarotti Club members on plein air excursions into the bush, and while his landscapes won admiration, he for the most part devoted himself to in-studio figure painting. For this reason he is considered a peripheral figure to the impressionistic Heidelberg School movement, founded by Buonarotti Club members McCubbin and Tom Roberts.

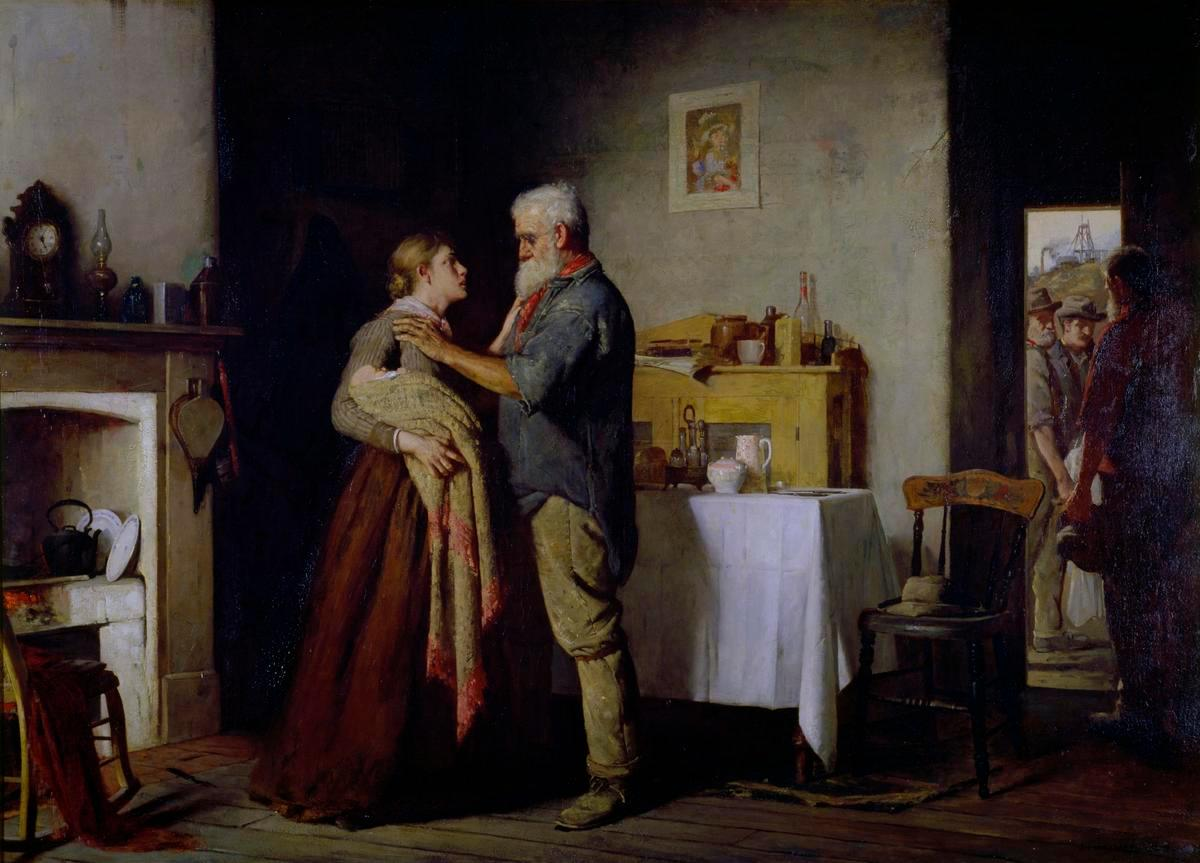
Breaking the News, 1887, Art Gallery of Western Australia

An early critical success of Longstaff's was the narrative painting Motherless, which won first prize in the National Gallery School's annual exhibition in 1886, and was purchased by Sir George Frederic Verdon. It is now in the collection of the National Gallery of Australia. Longstaff remained an active senior member of the Buonarotti Club until its demise in 1887 when he was given a well-attended farewell at the Melbourne Coffee Palace on 23 August, before sailing to London. The occasion was his winning the National Gallery of Victoria's first travelling scholarship for his 1887 narrative painting Breaking the News, which sold for 100 guineas and became widely recognisable in Australia through reproductions, even inspiring a 1912 film of the same name. He had married Rosa Louisa (Topsy) Crocker on 20 July that year at Powlett Street, East Melbourne and with his new wife sailed on the Valetta from Melbourne for London in September 1887.

=== Europe ===
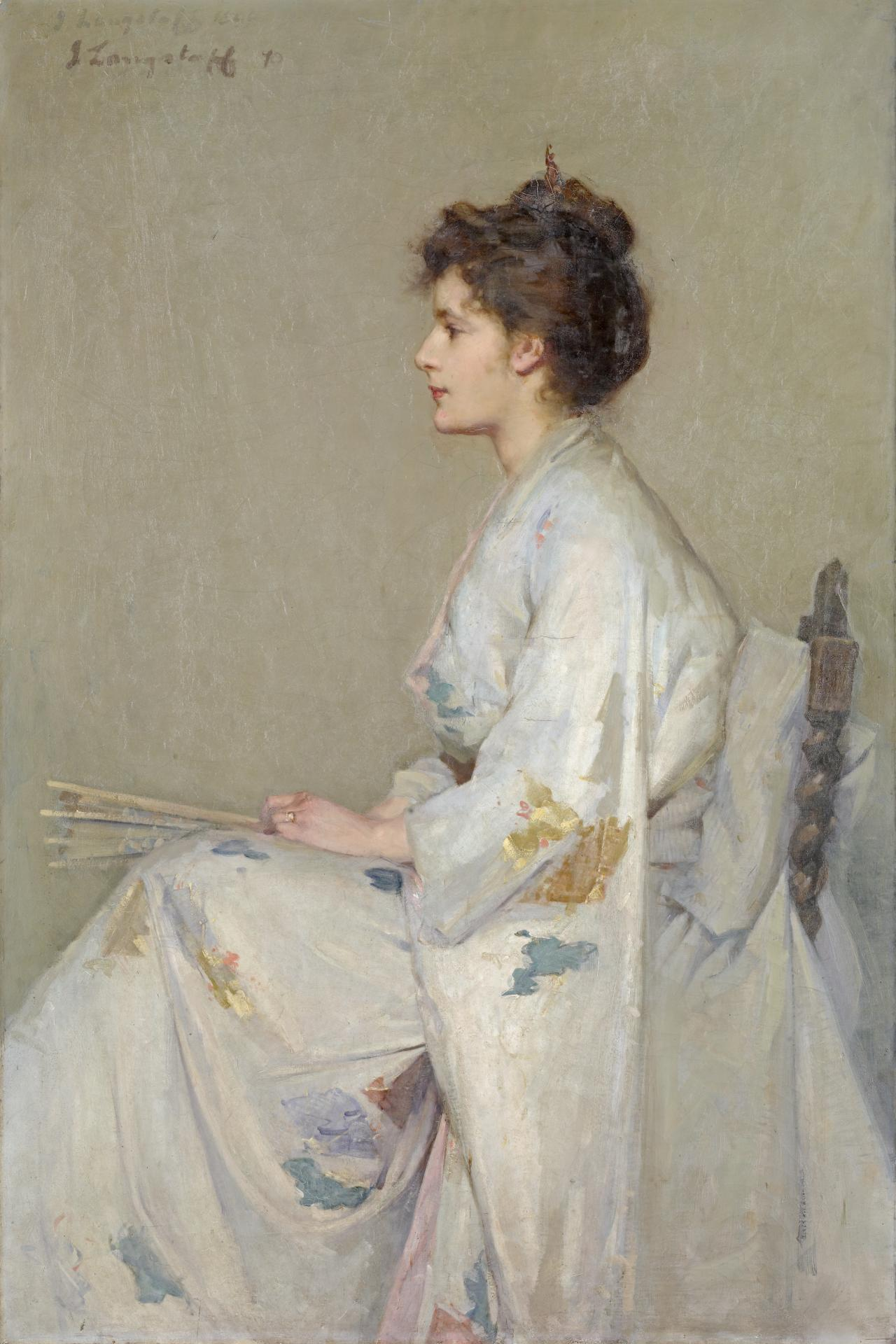
Lady in Grey, 1890, National Gallery of Victoria

After staying several weeks in London, Longstaff and his wife moved to Paris in January 1888, where they mingled with expatriate artists from Australia, including John Russell, who encouraged Longstaff to adopt impressionist techniques, resulting in a temporary brightening of his palette and more daring brushwork. This change in style can be seen in landscapes he painted during his stay at Russell's home on Belle Île, in the summer of the 1889. Also on Russell's advice, Longstaff attended the atelier of Fernand Cormon alongside the likes of Henri de Toulouse-Lautrec and Charles Conder, who had recently arrived from Australia and would go on to paint Topsy's portrait. Longstaff also studied at Académie Colarossi, where he reconnected with Buonarotti Club member David Davies. In 1890, Longstaff exhibited works 'on the line' at the Paris Salon, including the crowd-pleaser Lady in Grey, a Whistlerian portrait of Topsy in a kimono. The following year, he achieved a mention honorable at the Salon with The Young Mother. He later moved to London, where he painted many portraits, for the most part adhering to a more conservative, academic style.

Longstaff returned to Australia in 1894 and was given several commissions. He occupied a studio at Grosvenor Chambers in Melbourne from 1897 to 1900. The National Gallery of Victoria assumed ownership of The Sirens under terms of the scholarship and bought his large landscape Gippsland, Sunday night, 20 February 1898. He travelled to London again in 1901, where he exhibited with the Royal Academy.

=== War artist ===
Longstaff was appointed an official war artist with the First AIF. He made several portraits of officers in the military. On his return to Australia he won several awards and was given distinguished positions, such as his appointment to President of the Victorian Artists Society in 1924 and Trustee of the National Gallery of Victoria in 1927. He was knighted in the 1928 New Year Honours List, the first Australian artist to have had this honour.

=== Portraitist ===
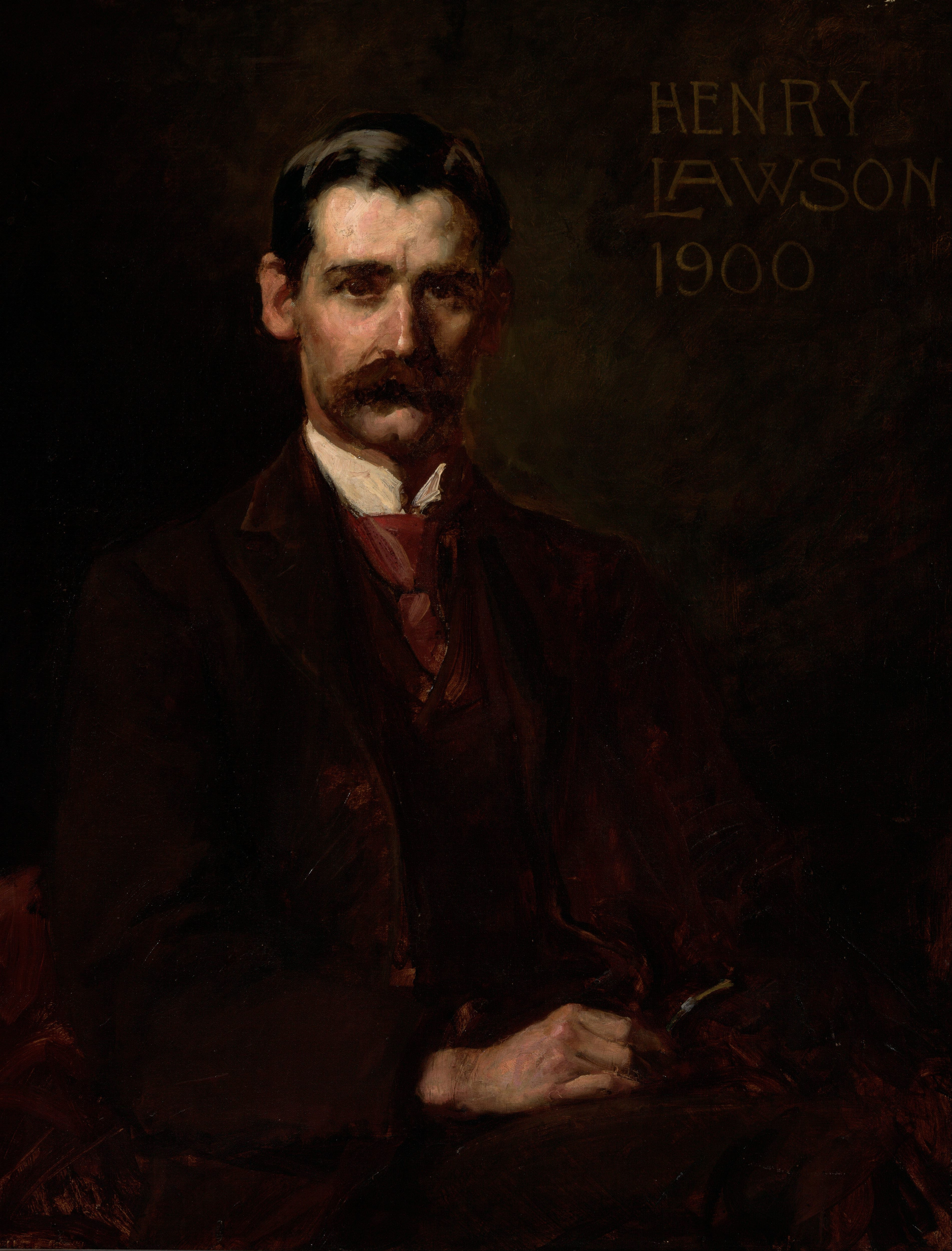
Henry Lawson, 1900, Art Gallery of New South Wales

In 1900 in Melbourne, Longstaff was commissioned by J. F. Archibald, founder and editor of The Bulletin, to paint a portrait of poet and short story writer Henry Lawson. Archibald was delighted with the result, prompting him to establish the Archibald Prize, now Australia's most prestigious prize for portraiture. Longstaff went on to win the prize five times.

In 1924, Longstaff met Miss Jessica Harcourt, at the time a theatre programme seller, and later actress, in Sydney and later called "Australia's loveliest girl". He was struck by her beauty and painted her twice. In 1925, he exhibited Harcourt's portrait with Twenty Melbourne Painters at the Athenaeum Hall. Longstaff was happy with his subject, regarding Harcourt as "almost a perfect type of feminine beauty", and it was considered "one of the best things he had ever done."

His 1929 portrait of the artist Ellis Rowan was the first nationally funded memorial portrait of a woman in Australia, to which people of all the states subscribed in honour of a woman considered to be of outstanding qualities.

The Art Gallery of South Australia holds his portraits of Paris Nesbit and The Artist's Wife.

Longstaff's portraits of women were the subject of the 2012 exhibition Portrait of a Lady at the Shepparton Art Museum.

== Legacy ==
His biography Portrait in Youth, written by Nina Murdoch was published in 1948. His 1920 portrait of Nina Murdoch has been exhibited in Reading Room of the National Library, Canberra (1 July 2005 – 15 September 2010) and Shepparton Art Gallery, (2 December 2011 – 12 February 2012).

== Archibald prize ==
His Archibald Prize winning pieces:

- 1925 - Portrait of Maurice Moscovitch
- 1928 - Portrait of Dr Alexander Leeper
- 1929 - W A Holman, KC
- 1931 - Sir John Sulman
- 1935 - A B ('Banjo') Paterson

== Gallery ==
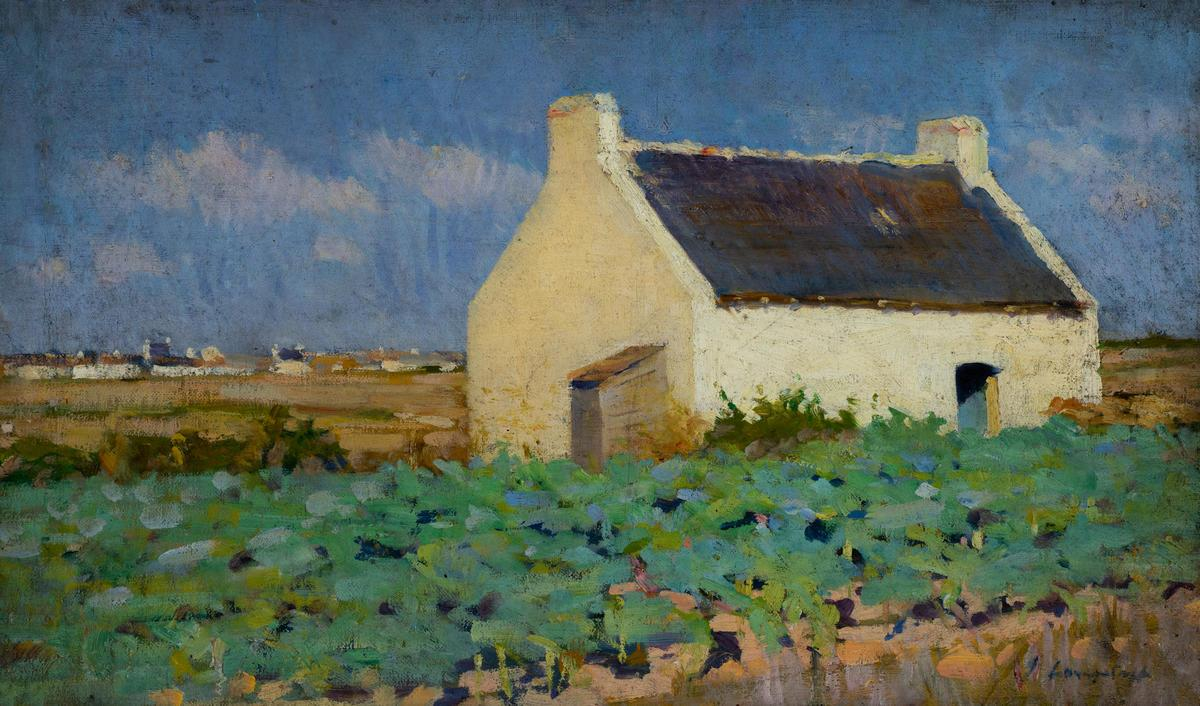
Cabbage Plot, Belle-Île, 1889, Castlemaine Art Museum

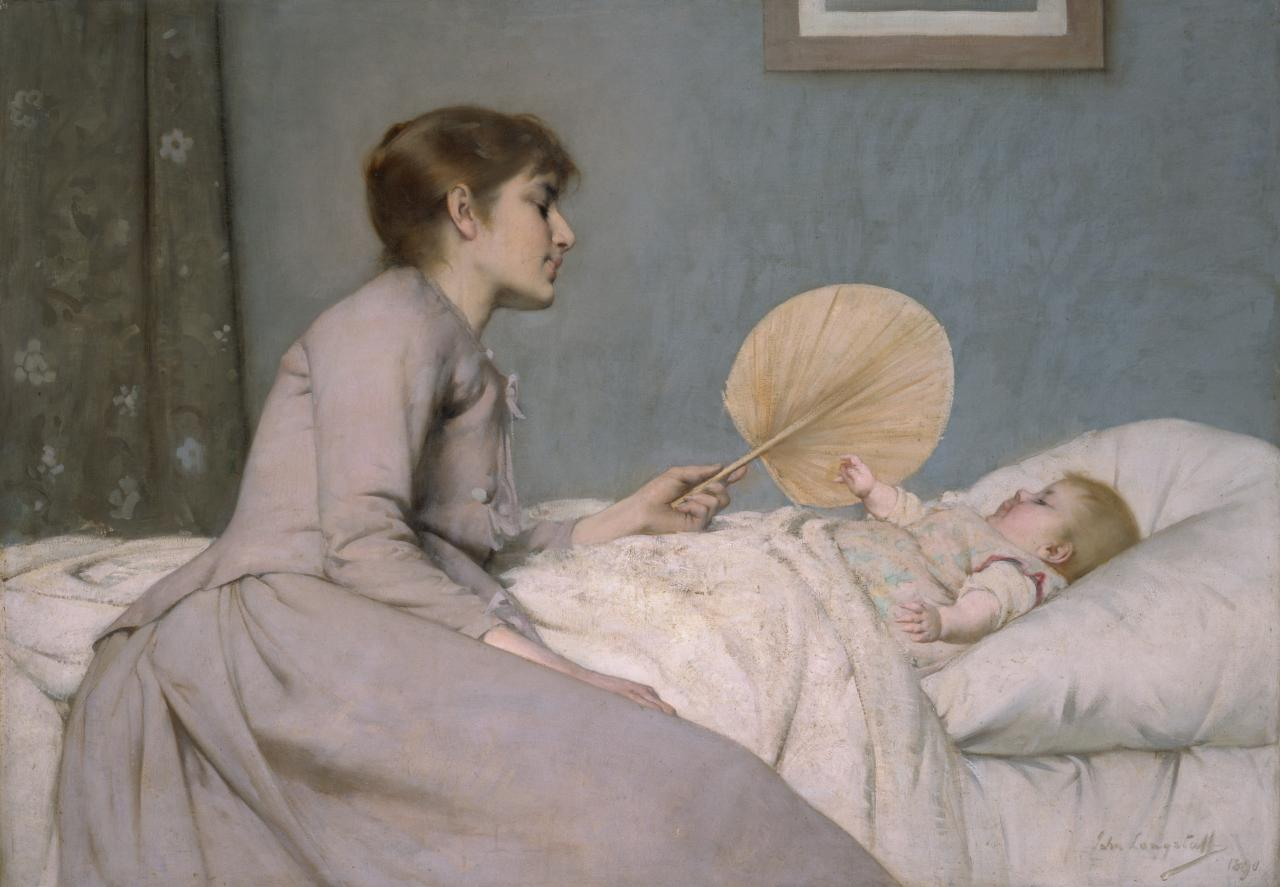
The Young Mother, 1891, National Gallery of Victoria

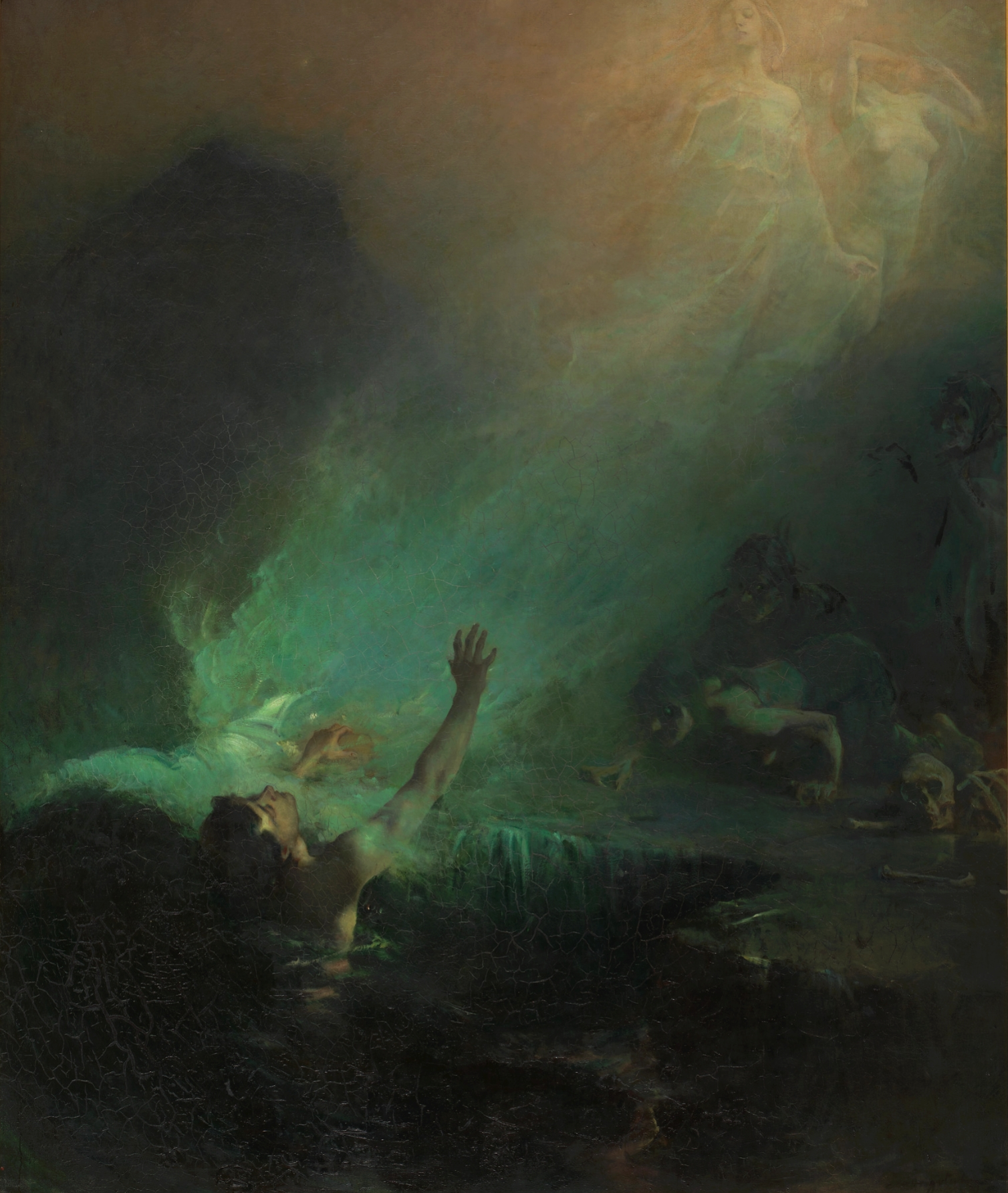
The Sirens, 1892, National Gallery of Victoria

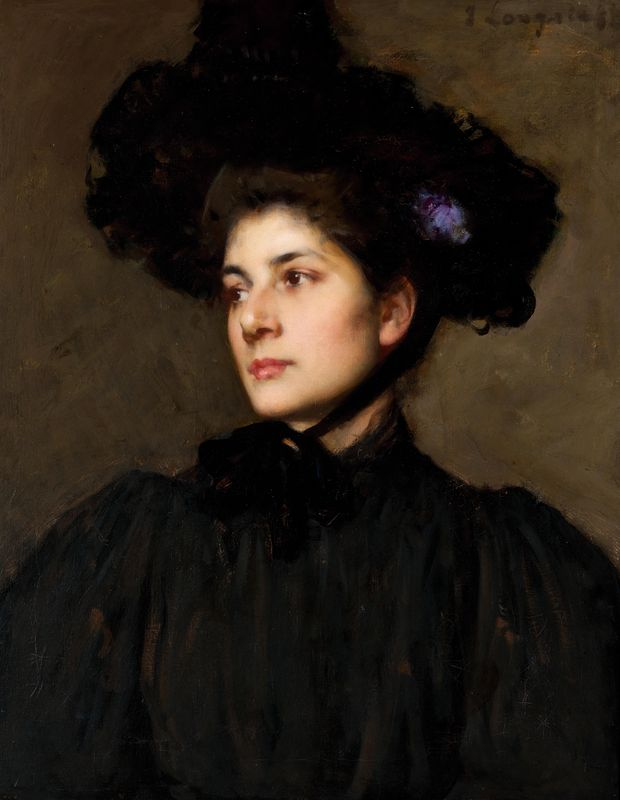
The Artist's Wife, 1896, Art Gallery of South Australia

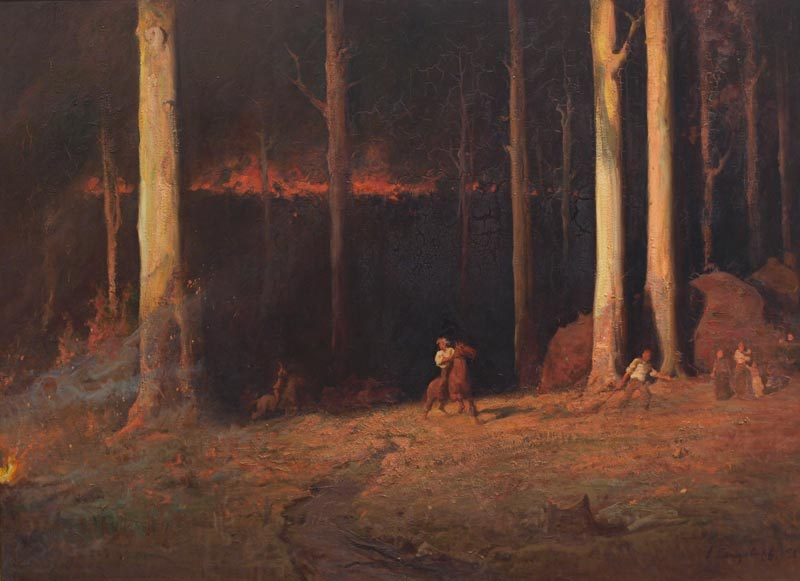
Gippsland, Sunday night, February 20th, 1898, 1898, National Gallery of Victoria

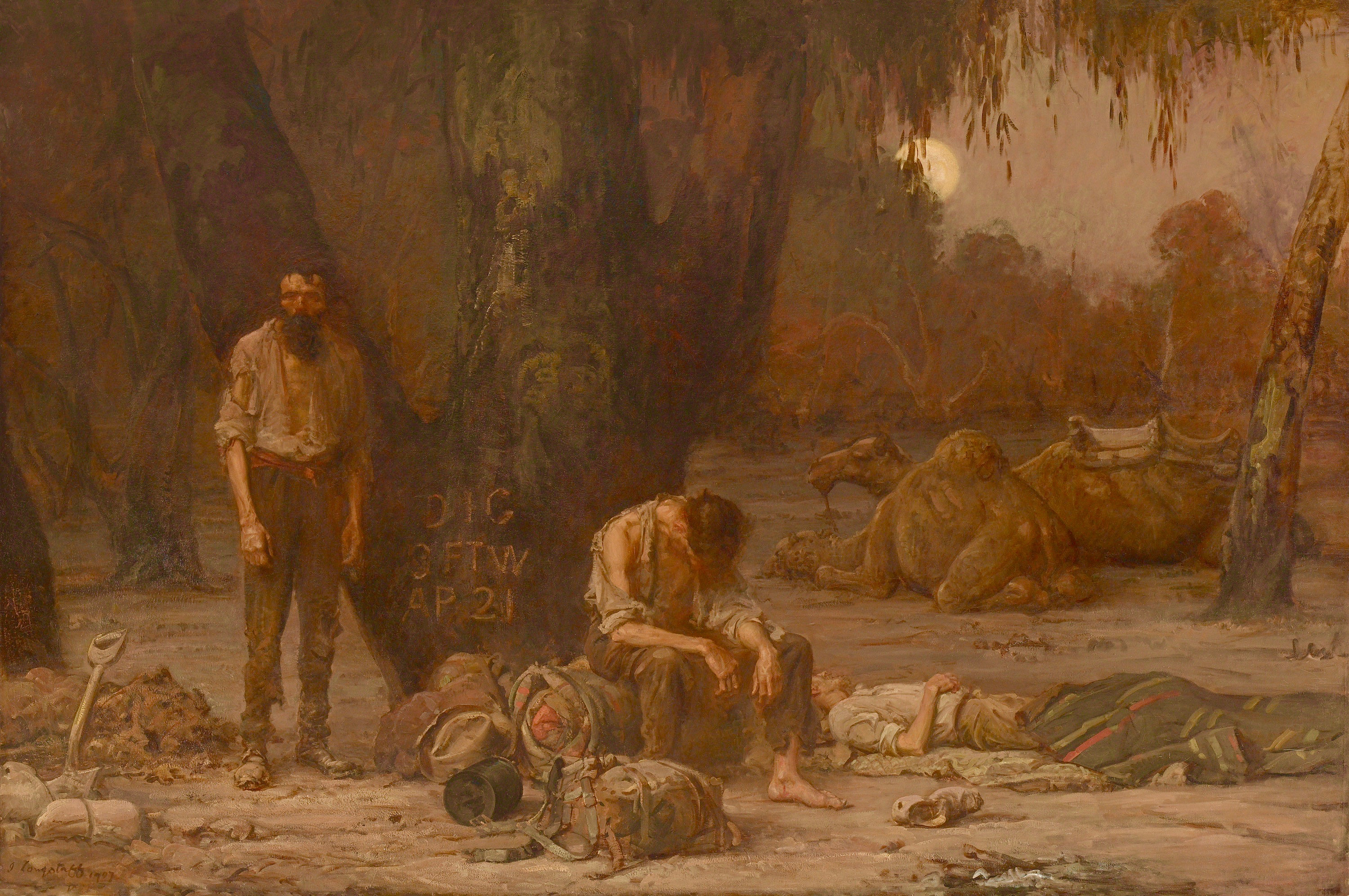
Arrival of Burke, Wills and King at the deserted camp at Cooper's Creek, Sunday evening, 21 April 1861, 1907, National Gallery of Victoria

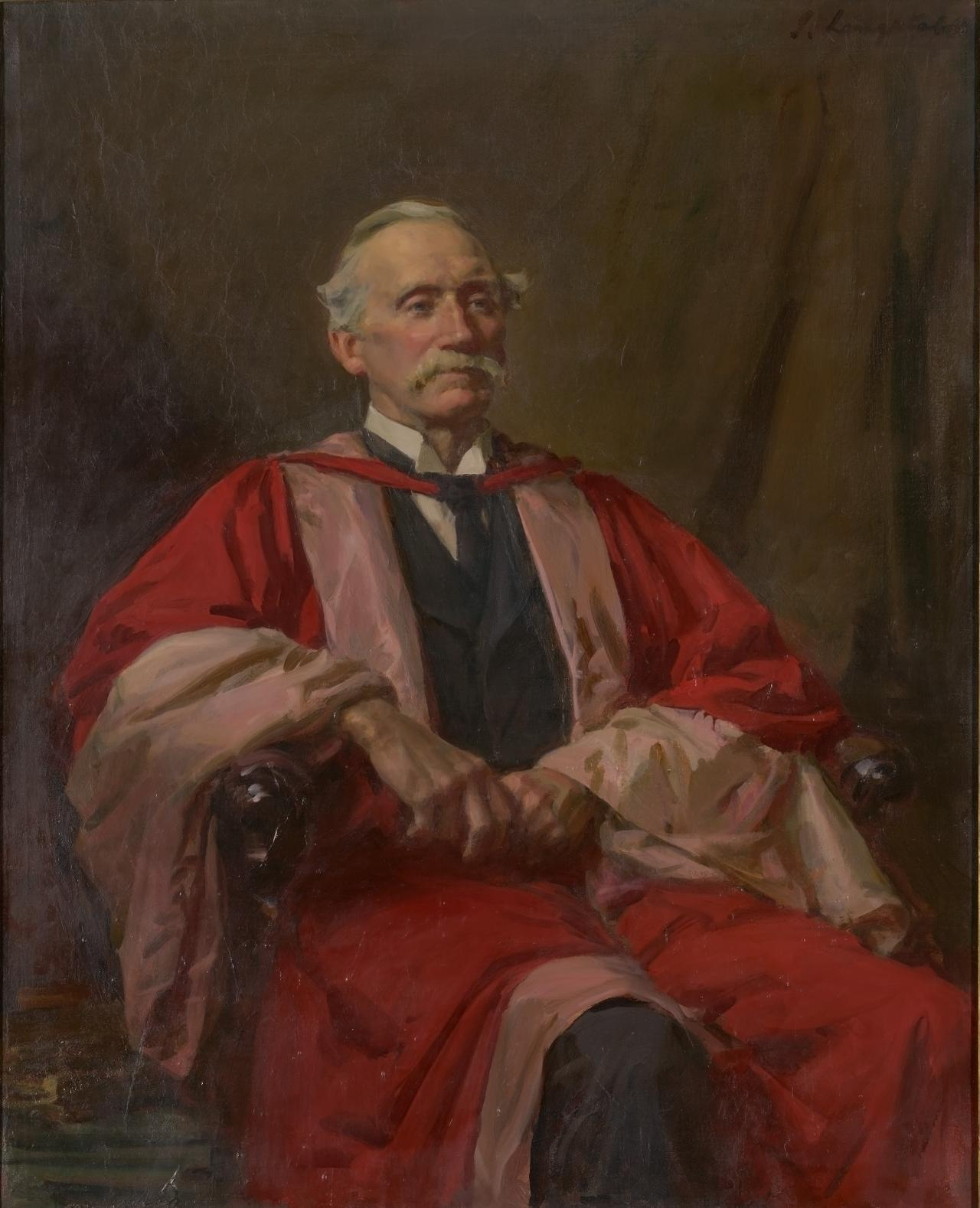
Dr Alexander Leeper, National Gallery of Victoria, 1928

Awards
Preceded by William Beckwith McInnes	Archibald Prize; 1925 for Portrait of Maurice Moscovitch	Succeeded by William Beckwith McInnes
Preceded by George Washington Lambert	Archibald Prize; 1928 for Portrait of Dr. Alexander Leeper; 1929 for W. A. Holman, K.C.	Succeeded by William Beckwith McInnes
Preceded by William Beckwith McInnes	Archibald Prize; 1931 for Sir John Sulman	Succeeded by Ernest Buckmaster
Preceded by Henry Hanke	Archibald Prize; 1935 for A. B. ('Banjo') Paterson	Succeeded by William Beckwith McInnes
