= William Beckwith McInnes =

Australian portrait painter

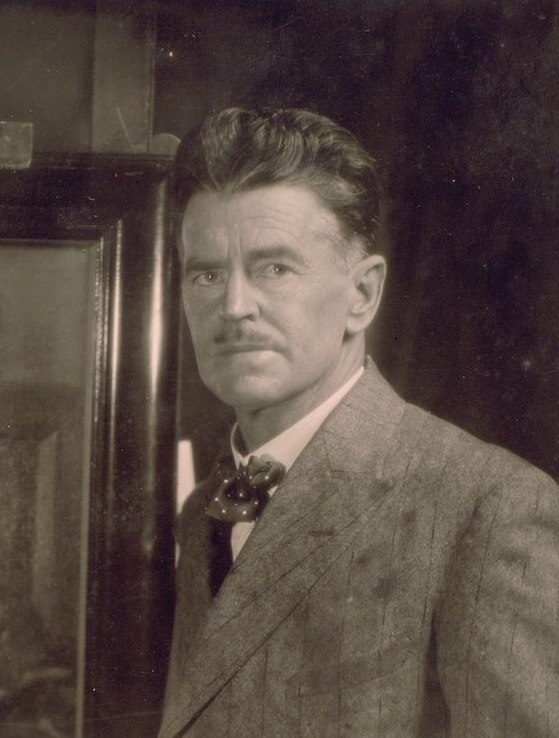
- Born: 18 May 1889; St Kilda, Melbourne, Victoria
- Died: 9 November 1939 (aged 50); Melbourne, Victoria
- Known for: portraits
- Spouse: Violet Murial Musgrave (1915–39)
- Awards: Archibald Prize, 7 times between 1921–1939; Wynne Prize (1921)

William Beckwith McInnes (18 May 1889 – 9 November 1939) was an Australian portrait painter, winner of the Archibald Prize seven times for his work. He was acting-director at the National Gallery of Victoria and an instructor in its art school.

== Early life ==
McInnes was born in St Kilda, a suburb of Melbourne, to Malcolm McInnes and his wife Alice Agnes, née Beckwith. Despite lack of family artistic tradition, he was keen to draw from the time he could hold a pencil. In 1903, at 14 years of age, he enrolled in the drawing school of the National Gallery of Victoria under Frederick McCubbin. Later he moved up to the painting school under Lindsay Bernard Hall.

== Artistic career ==
Amongst the many portraits by McInnes were those of the surgeons Archibald Watson and Wood Jones.

McInnes' artwork is featured at the Art Gallery of South Australia and the Art Gallery of NSW. In addition, McInnes has painted a variety of important people in Australian history including officials and aristocratic families.

== Late life ==
McInnes suffered from an imperfect heart all his life. On 30 November 1937 around midnight the car he was driving struck and killed a pedestrian, James Lowrey, on Brunswick Street in Fitzroy. At the inquest evidence was brought forward that a drug (Luminal) he was taking for the condition could have affected his driving and been responsible for his staggering and not remembering details of the accident. He was not convicted of any offence.

== McInnes' Archibald Prize winners ==
- 1921 - Desbrowe Annear
- 1922 - Professor Harrison Moore
- 1923 - Portrait of a Lady
- 1924 - Miss Collins
- 1926 - Silk and Lace (Miss Esther Paterson)
- 1930 - Drum-Major Harry McClelland
- 1936 - Dr. Julian Smith
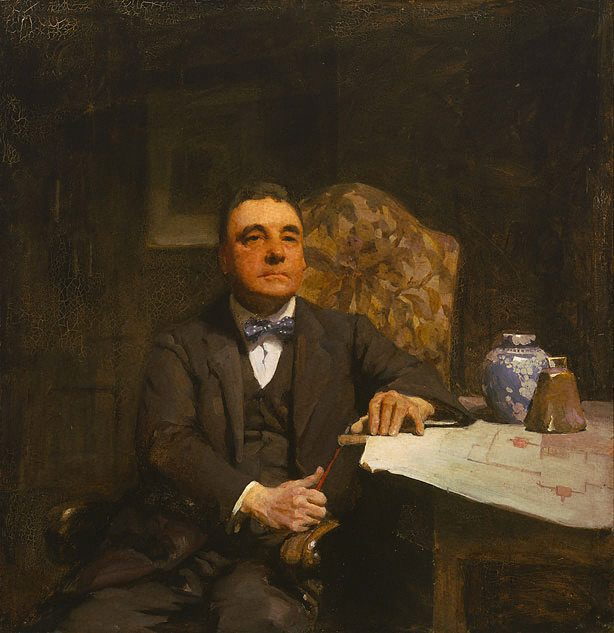
1921

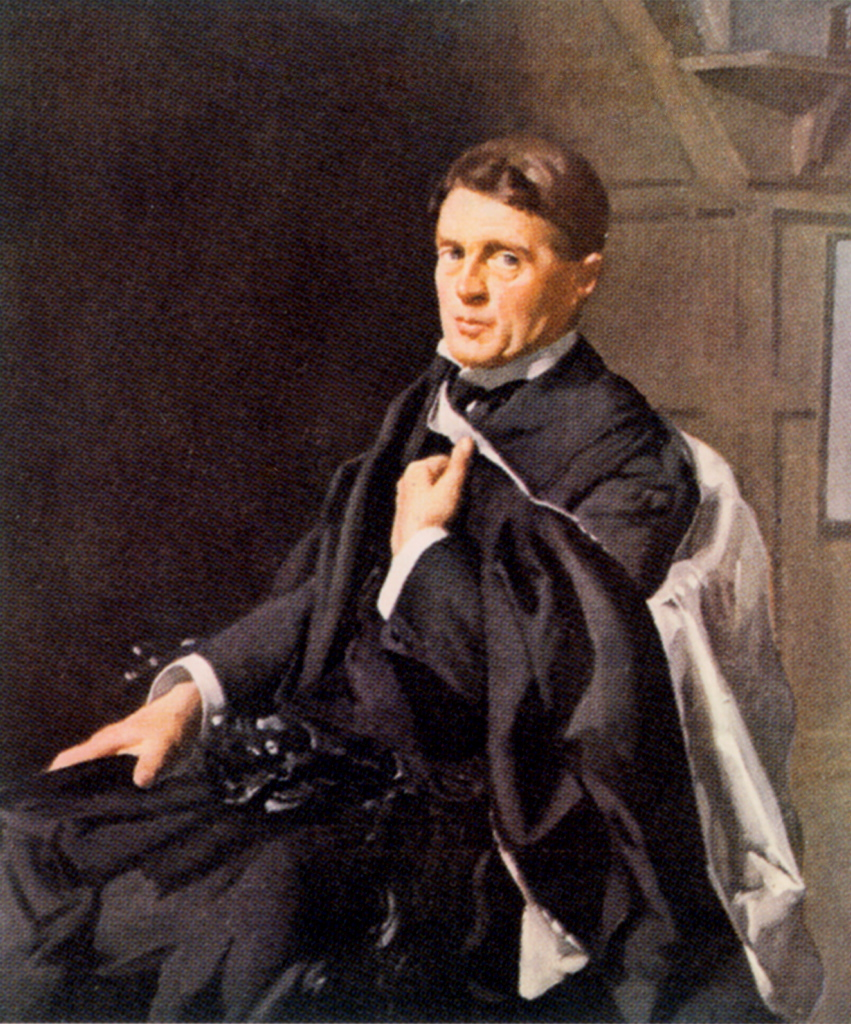
1922

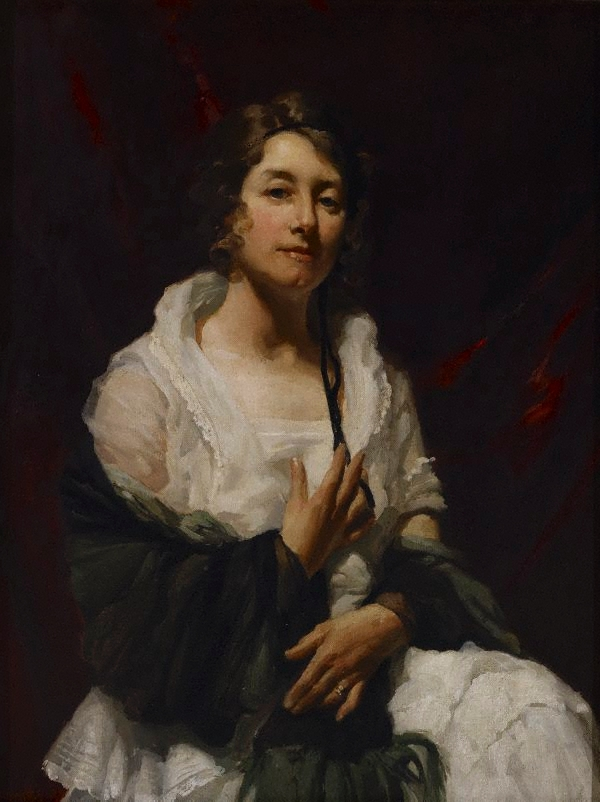
1923

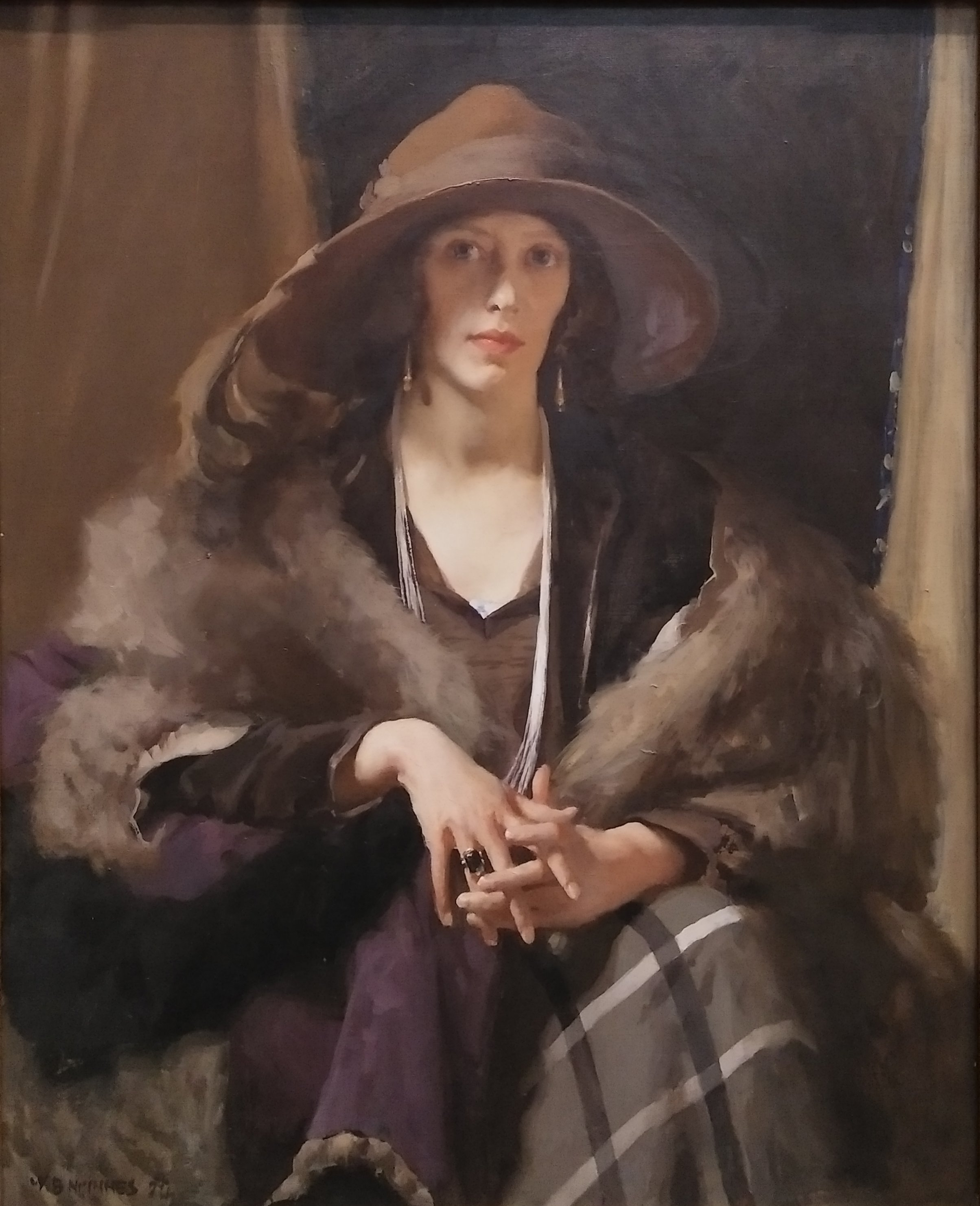
1924

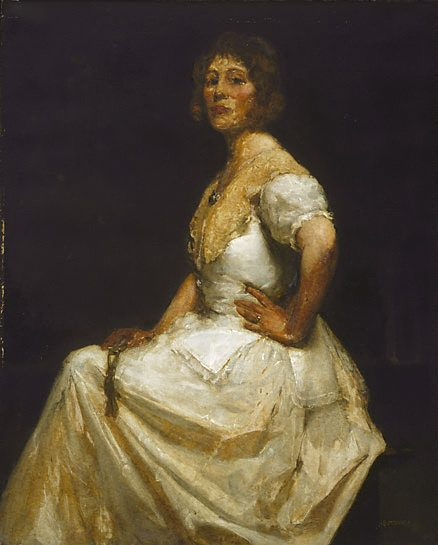
1926

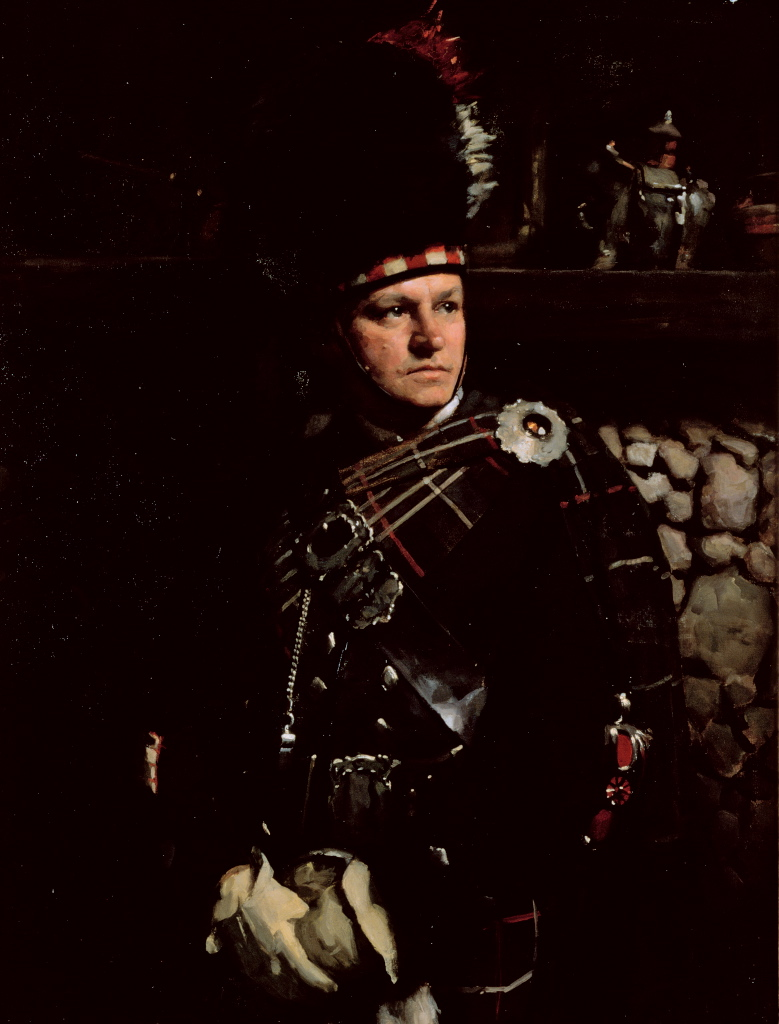
1930

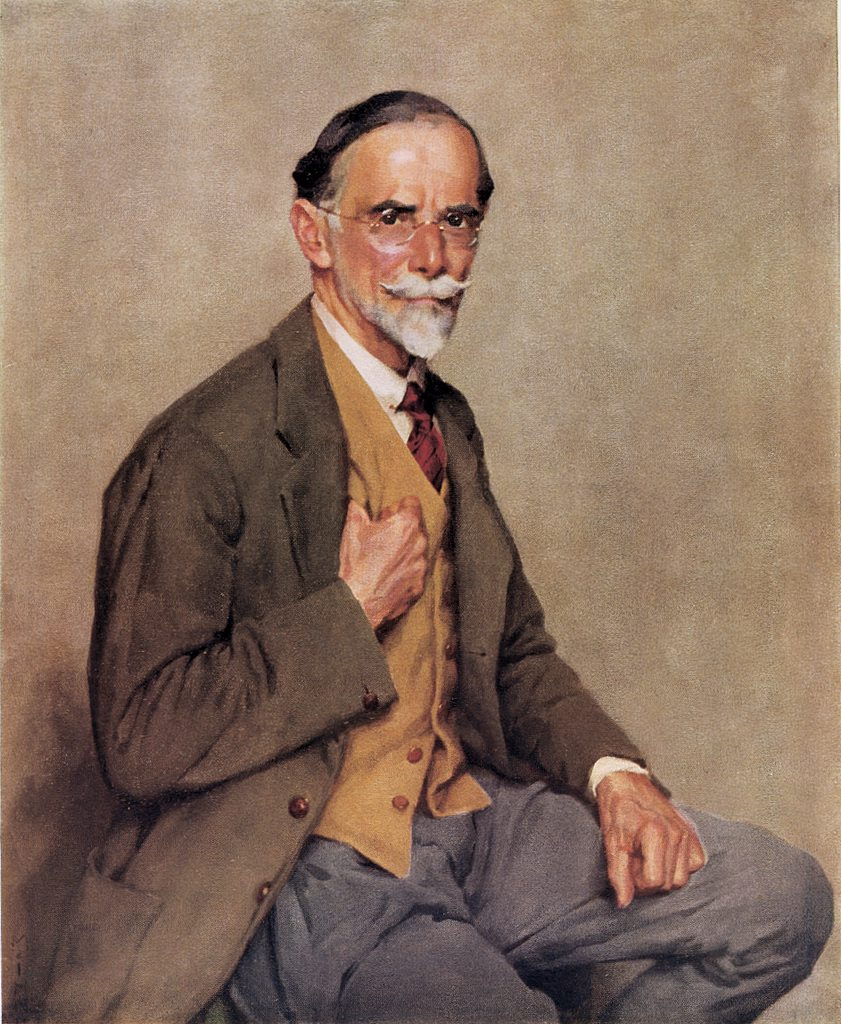
1936

McInnes also won the Wynne Prize in 1918 with The Grey Road.

== Sources ==
- Haese, Richard. "McInnes, William Beckwith (Billy) (1889–1939)". McInnes, William Beckwith (1889 - 1939). MUP.
- Serle, Percival (1949). "McInnes, William Beckwith". Dictionary of Australian Biography. Sydney: Angus & Robertson.

Awards and achievements
Preceded by new award	Archibald Prize; 1921 for Desbrowe Annear; 1922 for Professor Harrison Moore; 1923 for Portrait of a Lady; 1924 for Portrait of Miss Collins	Succeeded by John Longstaff
Preceded by John Longstaff	Archibald Prize; 1926 for Silk and Lace	Succeeded by George Washington Lambert
Preceded by John Longstaff	Archibald Prize; 1930 for Drum-Major Harry McClelland	Succeeded by John Longstaff
Preceded by John Longstaff	Archibald Prize; 1936 for Dr. Julian Smith	Succeeded by Normand Baker
