= Valerie Yule =

Australian clinical child psychologist (1929–2021)

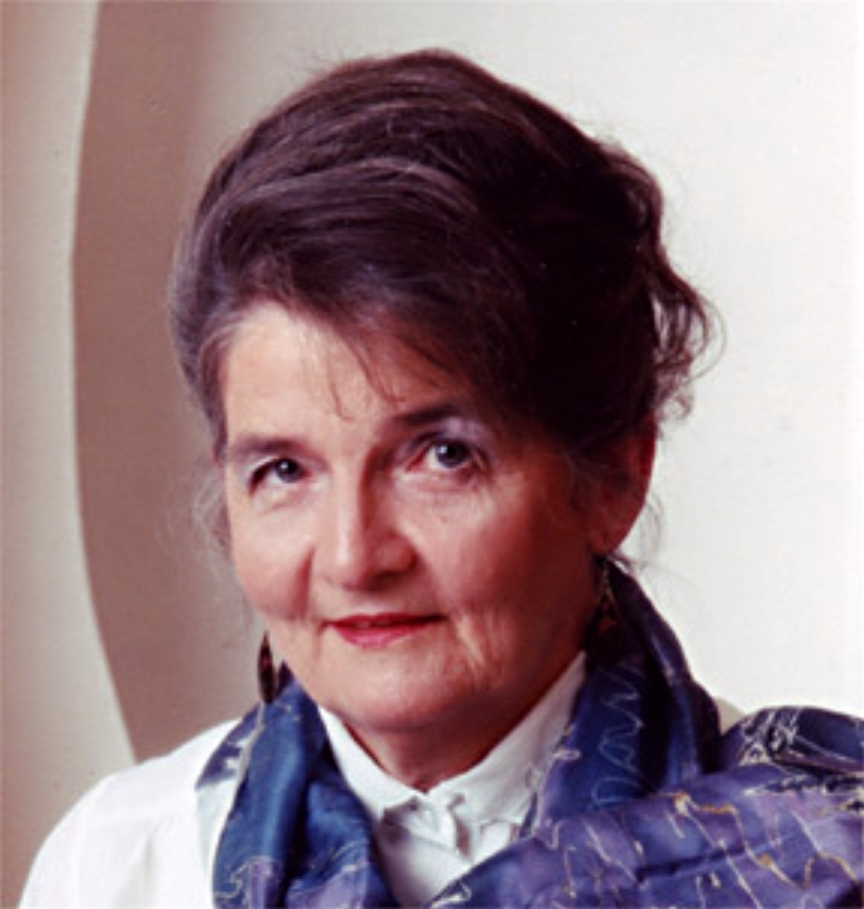
Valerie Yule

Valerie Constance Yule OAM (2 January 1929 – 28 January 2021) was an Australian researcher in literacy and imagination, and a clinical child psychologist, academic, school psychologist and teacher. She worked in disadvantaged schools; the Melbourne and Monash Universities in psychology and education; the Royal Children's Hospital, Melbourne and the Royal Aberdeen Children's Hospital; and as an honorary research fellow of psychology at Aberdeen University.

Yule died on 28 January 2021. She was posthumously awarded the Medal of the Order of Australia at the 2021 Queen's Birthday Honours.

== Education ==
She attended Methodist Ladies' College, Melbourne (East 1945). She obtained BA (Hons) in History and English, from the Janet Clarke Hall at the University of Melbourne; after the birth of her children, she returned to her studies and completed an MA Psychology and Dip Ed. In the early 1990s, she studied for a PhD Education at Monash University, with a research thesis on Orthography and Reading, Spelling and Society.

== Work ==
Yule carried out research to remove barriers to literacy. This includes the concept of online access to understanding and self-help, and improving English spelling by maximising its advantages as well as reducing its disadvantages to meet needs and abilities of users and learners. She has also studied children's imagination and its applications. Other interests include alternatives for social problems; more natural childcare; preventing waste of intelligence; the cognitive effects of very loud music; non-destructive pleasures; economic and political alternatives for sustainability without requiring continual growth; humane solutions to population growth; cutting production of waste to reduce carbon emissions; and the psychology of peace.

== Memberships ==
- Fellow of the Galton Institute (UK)
- Member, British Psychological Society
- Vice-President, Simplified Spelling Society (UK)
- Member, Independent Scholars Association of Australia, and of Australian educational and social reforming organizations.
- Founder, non-profit Australian Centre for Social Innovations, 1991
- Member, the British Institute for Social Inventions, 1984

== Published work ==
- What Happens to Children: The Origins of violence. A Collection of stories told by disadvantaged children who could not write them. Sydney: Angus & Robertson 1979
- Psychology For Teenagers - Making the Most of Who You Are
- What's Primary School for, anyway? Melbourne: Primary Education, 1981
- The Encyclopaedia of Social Inventions. Ed. Valerie Yule & Nicholas Albery. Institute of Social Inventions. London. 1989.
- The Book of Spells & Misspells. Sussex, UK: The Book Guild. 2005
- L. Ivanov and V. Yule. Roman Phonetic Alphabet for English. Contrastive Linguistics. XXXII, 2007, 2. pp. 50–64
- Psychology for Teenagers, Literacy Innovations 2009
- Inside Children’s Minds, BookPal 2014
- Four months in pre-war Korea: a memoir from the 1950s, V. Yule and E. Anderson 2020

== Family life ==
She was born Valerie Constance East and was the eldest of three sisters; she married the Reverend George Yule in December 1948 and they had three children.

== See also ==
- Interspel
