= Tom Allsop =

Australian rules footballer (1929–2019)

Personal information
- Full name: Thomas Foster Allsop
- Born: 2 September 1929
- Died: 27 September 2019 (aged 90)
- Original team: Melbourne High School
- Height: 178 cm (5 ft 10 in)
- Weight: 76 kg (168 lb)
- Position: Wing / Centre

Playing career^{1}
Years	Club	Games (Goals)
1949–1954	Hawthorn	58 (42)
- ^{1} Playing statistics correct to the end of 1954.

Thomas Foster Allsop (2 September 1929 – 27 September 2019) was an Australian rules footballer who played with Hawthorn in the Victorian Football League (VFL).
