= Don Fish =

Australian graphic artist

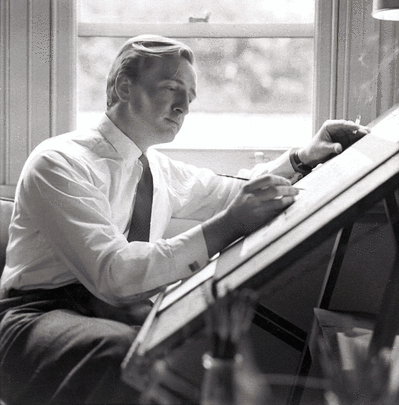
- Born: 25 April 1929; Australia
- Died: 13 July 2021 (aged 92)
- Occupations: Graphic designer, illustrator, cartoonist, writer

Donald Fish (25 April 1929 – 13 July 2021) was an Australian graphic designer, illustrator, cartoonist, award-winning poster designer and writer.

Between 1945 and 2005, Fish produced logotypes, packaging, illustrations and TV commercials as well as award-winning Australian poster designs for both business and the arts. One award-winning television commercial for British Airways featured John Le Mesurier was produced with John Flanagan and won a Bronze Lion at the Venice Film Festival.
