= The White Gloves =

- Directed by: Parviz Khatibi
- Produced by: Parviz Khatibi; Vahak Vartanian
- Production company: Alborz
- Release date: 12 April 1951
- Running time: 90 minutes
- Country: Iran
- Language: Persian

The White Gloves (Persian: دستکش سفید; Dastkeshe sefid) is a 1951 Iranian comedy film directed by Parviz Khatibi.

A father and his son both become infatuated with the same girl. Each attempts to attract her attention in their own way.

== Cast ==
- Rogheyeh Chehreh-Azad
- Hamid Ghanbari as Hamid

== Bibliography ==
- Mohammad Ali Issari. Cinema in Iran, 1900-1979. Scarecrow Press, 1989.
