= Barry Griffiths (Australian footballer) =

Australian rules footballer

Personal information
- Full name: Barry Griffiths
- Born: 12 July 1929
- Original team: Canterbury
- Height: 180 cm (5 ft 11 in)
- Weight: 82 kg (181 lb)

Playing career^{1}
Years	Club	Games (Goals)
1950–1952	Hawthorn	25 (9)
- ^{1} Playing statistics correct to the end of 1952.

Barry Griffiths (born 12 July 1929) is a former Australian rules footballer who played for the Hawthorn Football Club in the Victorian Football League (VFL).
