= Adam Inglis (footballer) =

Australian rules footballer (1929–1971)

Personal information
- Full name: Adam Sinclair Inglis
- Born: 14 July 1929
- Died: 21 July 2023 (aged 94)
- Original team: Melbourne University / Williamstown Methodists
- Height: 170 cm (5 ft 7 in)
- Weight: 62 kg (137 lb)

Playing career^{1}
Years	Club	Games (Goals)
1951	Carlton	2 (5)
- ^{1} Playing statistics correct to the end of 1951.

Adam Sinclair Inglis (14 July 1929 – 21 July 2023) was an Australian rules footballer who played with the Carlton Football Club in the Victorian Football League (VFL).

Inglis kicked five goals in his debut game, but was injured in his second game and never played in the VFL again. In 1952 he transferred to play for Footscray, but didn't play a senior game for them.
