= List of newspapers in Victoria =

This is a list of newspapers in Victoria in Australia.

This list includes both newspapers currently being published and titles which are now defunct. It includes information about the town or suburb in which the newspaper was published, the years of publication, and notes about title changes or papers merging. Newspapers in Victoria are generally published as major dailies (The Age and the Herald Sun) or regional and suburban weekly issues. Major regional newspapers such as the Ballarat Courier and the Geelong Advertiser are published six times a week.

This is the most complete list of every newspaper to ever be published in the state of Victoria in Australia and has been compiled to assist researchers.

== A ==
Newspaper	Town / suburb	Melbourne region	Status	Years of publication	Notes
About Town, Nhill and Kaniva News	Nhill	No	defunct	2008–2010	
Action	Carlton South	No	defunct	1971–1973	Later known as the Socialist-Left
The Advance (and Alliance Record) : Organ of the Victorian Alliance and the Advance Guard	East Melbourne	Yes	defunct	1915–1920	Later known as Clarion Call
Advertiser	Eltham	No	defunct	2003–2004	Previously known as the Advertiser (Northern and North-East eds) and Advertiser (Whittlesea-Kinglake-Yea ed) (merged)
The Advertiser	Footscray	No	defunct	1887–1895; 1897–1918	
Advertiser	Hurstbridge	No	defunct	1922–1939	Later known as the Eltham and Whittlesea Shires Advertiser
The Advertiser	Bendigo	No	defunct	2003–2010	Later known as the Bendigo Advertiser
Advertiser, East Gippsland News (Lakes Post ed)	Bairnsdale	No	defunct	1989–2005	
Advertiser, East Gippsland News (Lakes Sunshine Post ed)	Bairnsdale	No	defunct	1987–1989	Later known as the Advertiser, East Gippsland News (Lakes Post ed)
Advertiser, East Gippsland News and Market Guide (Bairnsdale ed)	Bairnsdale	No	defunct	1982–1987	Later known as East Gippsland News
Advertiser, East Gippsland News and Market Guide (Omeo ed)	Bairnsdale	No	defunct	1982–1984	Later known as Lakes Post
The Advertiser	Cheltenham	No	defunct	1983–1988	Later known as the Sandringham-Brighton Advertiser
The Advertiser	Maryborough	No	defunct	1949–1953	Later known as the Maryborough Advertiser
The Advertiser	Melbourne	Yes	defunct	1982	Previously known as the Footscray and District Advertiser
The Advertiser	Morwell	No	defunct	1956–1965	Later known as the Morwell Advertiser
Advertiser and Inglewood, Tarnagulla, Korong and Kingower Chronicle	Inglewood	No	defunct	1863–1866	Later known as the Inglewood Advertiser and Sentinel Combined
Advertiser (Mulgrave and Oakleigh edition)	Brighton	No	defunct	1959–1962	Later known as the Southern Cross (Henty ed)
Advertiser (Northern and North East eds)	Eltham	No	defunct	2003	Merged with the Advertiser (Whittlesea-Kinglake-Yea ed) to form the Advertiser
Advertiser and Observer	Collingwood	No	defunct	1871–1878	Later known as the Observer, City and Suburban Advertiser
The Advertiser : West Melbourne, Yarraville and Braybrook Reporter	Footscray	No	defunct	1887–1952	Later known as the Footscray Advertiser
Advertiser (Whittlesea-Kinglake-Yea ed)	Eltham	No	defunct	2003	Merged with the Advertiser (Northern and North East eds) to form the Advertiser
The Adviser	Shepparton	No	current	2008–	Previously known as the Shepparton Adviser
Advocate (Brimbank ed)	Footscray	No	defunct	1995–2010	Later known as the Brimbank Weekly
Advocate	Melbourne	Yes	defunct	1868–1990	
The Advocate	Daylesford	No	defunct	2003–2020	Previously known as the Hepburn Shire Advocate
The Advocate	Hepburn	No	current	2020–	Previously known as the Advocate (Daylesford)
The Advocate	Korumburra	No	defunct	1948–1959	Previously known as the Great Southern Advocate
The Advocate	Moe	No	defunct	1962–1965	Later known as the Moe Advocate
The Advocate Spa Cente News	Daylesford	No	defunct	1983–1984	Later known as the Daylesford Advocate
The Age	Melbourne	Yes	current	1854–	
The Age large print	Melbourne	Yes	defunct	1979–1982	Previously known as the Age large print weekly
The Age large print weekly	Melbourne	Yes	defunct	1976–1979	Later known as the Age large print
The Age monthly review	Melbourne	Yes	defunct	1981–1990	Related to The Age
The Age (National ed)	Melbourne	Yes	defunct	2000	Other edition of The Age
The Age (Victorian ed)	Melbourne	Yes	defunct	1999–2001	Other edition of The Age
A. & J. Dobinson's Australian Gazette and Farmers' Times	Melbourne	Yes	defunct	1889	
A. Kay's Victorian Standard	Melbourne	Yes	defunct	1889	
The Albion	Melbourne	Yes	defunct	1847–1848	
The Alert	Melbourne	Yes	defunct	1897	
Alexandra, Eildon, Marysville Standard	Alexandra	No	current	1989–	Previously known as Alexandra and Eildon Standard and Yarck, Gobur, Thornton, Taggerty and Acheron Express
Alexandra Standard and Yarck, Gobur, Thornton, Taggerty and Acheron Express	Alexandra	No	defunct	1949–1957	Later known as the Alexandra Standard
Alexandra Times	Alexandra	No	defunct	1868–1877	Later known as Alexandra and Yea Standard, Thornton, Gobur and Acheron Express
Alexandra and Eildon Standard and Yarck, Gobur, Thornton, Taggerty and Acheron Express	Alexandra	No	defunct	1957–1989	Later known as Alexandra, Eildon, Marysville Standard
Alexandra and Yea Standard and Yarck, Gobur, Thornton and Acheron Express	Alexandra	No	defunct	1908–1949	Later known as Alexandra Standard and Yarck, Gobur, Thornton, Taggerty and Acheron Express
Alexandra and Yea Standard, Gobur, Thornton and Acheron Express	Alexandra	No	defunct	1877–1908	Later known as Alexandra and Yea Standard and Yarck, Gobur, Thornton and Acheron Express
Alexandra and Yea Standard, Thornton, Gobur and Acheron Express	Alexandra	No	defunct	1877	Later known as Alexandra and Yea Standard, Gobur, Thornton and Acheron Express
Alexandra Standard	Alexandra	No	defunct	1957	Later known as Alexandra and Eildon Standard and Yarck, Gobur, Thornton, Taggerty and Acheron Express
Allendale Recorder	Melbourne	Yes	defunct	1897–1901	
Allendale, Smeaton and Kingston Telegraph	Allendale	No	defunct	1882–1888	
Alliance Record	Melbourne	Yes	defunct	1881–1915	Later known as The Advance (and Alliance Record)
Alpine Observer	Bright	No	defunct	1954–1994	Merged with the Myrtleford times and Ovens Valley advertiser to form the Alpine Times
The Alpine Observer	Bright	No	defunct	1999–2005	Later known as the Bright Observer
Alpine Observer (Kiewa Valley ed)	Wangaratta	No	defunct	2003–2004	Later known as the Alpine Observer (Kiewa Valley and Falls Creek ed)
Alpine Observer (Kiewa Valley and Falls Creek ed)	Wangaratta	No	defunct	2004-2005	Later known as the Kiewa Valley Observer
Alpine Observer and North-Eastern Herald	Bright	No	defunct	1881–1954	Later known as the Alpine Observer
Alpine Times	Myrtleford	No	defunct	1995–1999	Splits to form the Alpine Observer, and the Myrtleford Times
Alternative Voice	Mornington	No	defunct	2009–2018	
Altona Banner	Werribee	No	defunct	1963–1965	Previously known as the Altona Banner and Seaholme and Laverton Representative
Altona Banner and Seaholme and Laverton Representative	Werribee	No	defunct	1927–1963	Later known as the Altona Banner
Altona-Laverton Mail	Footscray	No	defunct	1995–2010	Later known as the Hobsons Bay Weekly
Altona Star	Altona	No	defunct	1957–1980	Previously known as the Star News
Al Wasat	Melbourne	Yes	current	2012–	
Amalgam	Prahran	No	defunct	1982	
Amherst and Back Creek Advertiser	Ballarat	No	defunct	1859–1860	Absorbed by the Maryborough and Dunolly Advertiser
Aozhou Qiao Bao	Melbourne	Yes	current	2000–	
A. Porter's Australian Chronicle, Farmers' and Miners' Gazette	Melbourne	Yes	defunct	1889	
Ararat Advertiser	Ararat	No	defunct	1925–2025	Merged with the Ararat Advocate
Ararat Advertiser and Chronicle for the Stawell and Wimmera Districts	Ararat	No	defunct	1885–1925	Merged with the Ararat Chronicle to form the Ararat Advertiser
Ararat Advocate	Beaufort	No	current	2020–	
Ararat Chronicle and Willaura and Lake Bolac Districts Recorder	Ararat	No	defunct	1909–1925	Merged with the Ararat Advertiser and Chronicle to form the Ararat Advertiser
Ararat Chronicle and Wimmera and Stawell Districts Recorder	Ararat	No	defunct	1891–1909	Later known as the Ararat Chronicle and Willaura and Lake Bolac Districts Recorder
Ararat and Pleasant Creek Advertiser and Chronicle for the District of Wimmera	Ararat	No	defunct	1861–1884	Later known as the Ararat Advertiser and Chronicle
Ararat Times and Pleasant Creek Advertiser	Ararat	No	defunct	1857	
The Arena	Melbourne	Yes	defunct	1900–1903	Merged with the Sun to form the Arena-Sun
The Arena-Sun	Melbourne	Yes	defunct	1903–1904	Later known as The Sun
The Argus	Melbourne	Yes	defunct	1848–1957	Previously known as the Melbourne Argus
Argus	Ouyen	No	defunct	1957	Later known as the Robinvale Argus
The Argus : Jeparit, Rainbow, Yaapeet	Rainbow	No	current	2013–	Previously known as the Rainbow-Jeparit Argus
The Argus week-end magazine	Melbourne	Yes	defunct	1937–1953	Supplement to the Argus
Armstrong Creek Times	Torquay	No	current	2000–	
Arrow	Melbourne	Yes	defunct	1888	
Ash Long's Independent	Eltham	No	defunct	1999	
Ash Long's Preston-Reservoir Advertiser	Eltham North	No	defunct	1966	
Ash Long's Yea Advertiser	Eltham	No	defunct	1999	
The Asian	Melbourne	Yes	defunct	1977–1979	Later known as the New Asian
Asian Multimedia	Box Hill	No	current	1997–	
Asian Voice Weekly	South Melbourne	Yes	defunct	2008–2013	
Athletic Echo	Melbourne	Yes	defunct	1961–1996	
Athletic Floga	Fitzroy	No	defunct	1962	
Auctioneer	Boolarra	No	defunct	1932–1935	
The Auctioneer and Commercial Advertiser	Geelong	No	defunct	1888	
Aussie Post	Melbourne	Yes	defunct	1997–2002	Previously known as the New Post
The Australasian	Melbourne	Yes	defunct	1864–1946	
Australasian Pictorial	Melbourne	Yes	defunct	1927–1937	Supplement to the Australasian
Australasian Post	Melbourne	Yes	defunct	1946–1996	Later known as the New Australasian Post
The Australasian Sketcher with Pen and Pencil	Melbourne	Yes	defunct	1873–1889	Absorbed by The Australasian
The Australian	Richmond	No	defunct	1858–1883	Later known as the Richmond Australian
Australia-Asia Business Review	Box Hill	No	defunct	2001	
Australia Migrant Times	Preston	No	defunct	2014–2015	
Australian Army	Melbourne	Yes	defunct	1959–1980	Later known as Army (Canberra)
Australian Chinese Age (Da Hua shi dai)	Abbotsford	No	defunct	1998–2002	Later known as Shi dai zhou bao (Australian Chinese Age)
Australian Chinese Age (Mo'erben shi bao)	Melbourne	Yes	defunct	2013–2019	Previously known as Mo'erben zhou bao (Australian Chinese Age)
Australian Chinese Age (Mo'erben zhou bao)	Melbourne	Yes	defunct	2010–2013	Later known as Mo'erben shi bao (Australian Chinese Age)
Australian Chinese Age (Shi dai zhou bao)	Melbourne	Yes	defunct	2003–2009	Later known as Mo'erben zhou bao (Australian Chinese Age)
Australian Chinese Age Education and Immigration	Melbourne	Yes	defunct	1998–2015	Supplement to the Australian Chinese Age
Australian Chinese Age Entertainment Weekly	Melbourne	Yes	defunct	2006–2017	Supplement to the Australian Chinese Age
Australian Chinese Age Property Weekly	Melbourne	Yes	defunct	1998–2019	Supplement to the Australian Chinese Age
Australian Chinese News	Melbourne	Yes	current	2007–	
Australian Computer Weekly	Melbourne	Yes	defunct	1971–1973	Later known as the Pacific Computer Weekly
Australian Democratic Labor	Melbourne	Yes	defunct	1957–1958	Previously known as Australian Labor
Australian Horse Week	Narre Warren	No	defunct	1976	
Australian Israelite	Melbourne	Yes	defunct	1871–1875	
Australian Jewish Herald	Melbourne	Yes	defunct	1920–1933	Merged with Australian Life to form the Jewish Weekly News
Australian Jewish Herald	Melbourne	Yes	defunct	1935–1968	Previously part of Jewish Weekly News
Australian Jewish News	Melbourne	Yes	current	1935–	Previously part of Jewish Weekly News
Australian Jewish Post	St. Kilda	No	defunct	1966–1968	Previously known as the Jewish Post
Australian Labor	Melbourne	Yes	defunct	1955–1957	Later known as Australian Democratic Labor
Australian Life (Australier Leber)	Melbourne	Yes	defunct	1931–1933	Merged with the Australian Jewish Herald to form Jewish Weekly News
Australian Macedonian	Thomastown	No	defunct	1987–1990	Later known as the Australian-Macedonian Weekly
Australian Macedonian Today	Thomastown	No	current	2011–	Previously known as Today
Australian-Macedonian Weekly	Thomastown	No	defunct	1987	Later known as the Australian Macedonian
Australian Macedonian Weekly	Reservoir	No	current	1990–	Previously known as the Australian Macedonian
The Australian Magpie	Melbourne	Yes	defunct	1893	
Australian National Examiner	Prahran	No	defunct	1985	
Australian Newsagent	Prahran	No	defunct	1971–1972	Later known as Newsagent and Bookseller
Australian News For Home Readers	Melbourne	Yes	defunct	1864–1867	Later known as the Illustrated Australian News For Home Readers
Australian News Weekly	Melbourne	Yes	defunct	1964–1965	Later known as Australia's National News-Weekly
Australian Pensioner	Dandenong	No	defunct	1981–1987	
Australian Pictorial Weekly	Melbourne	Yes	defunct	1880	
Australian Police News	Wedderburn	No	defunct	1895	
Australian Producer	Melbourne	Yes	defunct	1953–1968	Merged with the Victorial Wheat and Woolgrower to form the Victorian Farmer
Australian Singles News	West Melbourne	Yes	defunct	1983–1985	Later known as Singles
Australian Tit-Bits	Melbourne	Yes	defunct	1884–1886	Later known as Life
Australian Trades and Labour Journal	Carlton	No	defunct	1889	Previously known as The Trades' Hall Gazette : and literary journal
Australian Trotting Record	Burnley	No	defunct	1913–1978	Previously known as the Victorian Trotting Record
Australian Weekly	Melbourne	Yes	defunct	1894–1895	Later known as Australian Christian World (Sydney)
Australia's National News-Weekly	Melbourne	Yes	defunct	1947–1964	Later known as Australian News Weekly
Australia's National News-Weekly	Melbourne	Yes	defunct	1965	Later known as News Weekly
Australia Young Chinese News	Fitzroy	No	defunct	2005–2006	
Austrālijas Latvietis	Prahran	No	defunct	1949–2018	
Australische Deutsche Zeitung	Melbourne	Yes	defunct	1870–1873	
Australische Monatzeitung	Melbourne	Yes	defunct	1862	Later known as Deutsche Zeitung
Australo-Ellin	Melbourne	Yes	defunct	1949–1957	Later known as Neos Kosmos
Ausztráliai Magyarság	Melbourne	Yes	defunct	1964–1992	Previously known as Victoriai Magyarság
Aviation News	North Brighton	No	defunct	1965–1974	Later known as Aviation News and Airmarket
Aviation News and Airmarket	Prahran	No	defunct	1974–1977	Previously known as Aviation News
Avoca and District News	Avoca	No	defunct	1984–1994	Merged with the Riponshire Advocate to form the Pyrenees Advocate
Avoca and District Newsletter	Avoca	No	defunct	1981–1983	Later known as the Avoca Mail
Avoca Free Press	Avoca	No	defunct	1930–1932	Later known as the Avoca Free Press and Farmers' Journal
Avoca Free Press	Avoca	No	defunct	1944–1948	Previously known as the Avoca Free Press and Farmers' Journal
Avoca Free Press and Farmers' Journal	Avoca	No	defunct	1932–1944	Later known as the Avoca Free Press
Avoca Free Press and Farmers' and Miners' Journal	Avoca	No	defunct	1900; 1914–1918	Later known as the Avoca Free Press
Avoca Mail	Avoca	No	defunct	1876–1981	Later known as the Avoca and District Newsletter
Avoca Mail	Avoca	No	defunct	1983–1984	
Avoca Mail and Pyrenees District Advertiser	Avoca	No	defunct	1863–1981	Issues for Sept. 8, 1866-Jan. 4, 1876 have title: Avoca Mail and Landsborough, Moonambel, Redbank, Lexton, and St Arnaud advertiser

== B ==
Newspaper	Town / suburb	Melbourne region	Status	Years of publication	Notes
Bacchus Marsh Advertiser	Bacchus Marsh	No	defunct	1907–1908	Absorbed by the Bacchus Marsh Express
Bacchus Marsh and District Telegraph	Bacchus Marsh	No	defunct	1983–1985	Later known as the Bacchus Marsh Telegraph
Bacchus Marsh Express	Melton	No	defunct	1994–1995	Merges with the Mail-Express to form the Melton-Bacchus Marsh Express
Bacchus Marsh Express : and General Advertiser for Ballan, Melton, Myrniong, Blackwood, Gisborne, Egerton and Gordon Districts	Bacchus Marsh	No	defunct	1866–1943	Merged with the Melton-Bacchus Marsh Mail to form the Melton Mail-Express
Bacchus Marsh Express Telegraph	Bacchus Marsh	No	defunct	1996–2007	Later known as the Moorabool Express Telegraph
Bacchus Marsh Leader	Northcote	No	defunct	1999–2001	Later known as the Moorabool Leader
Bacchus Marsh News	Ballan	No	defunct	2006–2007	Merged with the Ballan News to form the Moorabool News
Bacchus Marsh Scoop	Bacchus Marsh	No	defunct	2015–2016	
Bacchus Marsh Telegraph	Gisborne	No	defunct	1985–1989	Later known as the Telegraph (Bacchus Marsh)
Bacchus Marsh Telegraph	Gisborne	No	defunct	1995	
Bairnsdale Advertiser	Bairnsdale	No	defunct	1927–1929	Later known as the Bairnsdale Advertiser and Tambo and Omeo Chronicle
Bairnsdale Advertiser	Bairnsdale	No	current	1994–	Previously known as the Bairnsdale Advertiser and East Gippsland Stock and Station Journal
Bairnsdale Advertiser and East Gippsland Stock and Station Journal	Bairnsdale	No	defunct	1946–1994	Later known as the Bairnsdale Advertiser
Bairnsdale Advertiser and Tambo and Omeo Chronicle	Bairnsdale	No	defunct	1877–1946	Later known as the Bairnsdale Advertiser
Bairnsdale Advertiser and Tambo and Omeo Chronicle	Bairnsdale	No	defunct	1929–1946	Later merged with Every Week to form the Bairnsdale Advertiser and East Gippsland Stock and Station Journal
Bairnsdale Advertiser and Week-end Pictorial News	Bairnsdale	No	defunct	1962–1964	Later merged with the Omeo Standard to form the Omeo-East Gippsland Pictorial Standard
Bairnsdale and Bruthen News	Bairnsdale	No	defunct	1882–1890	Later known as the Gippsland Daily News
Bairnsdale Courier	Bairnsdale	No	defunct	1895–1910	Other edition: Bairnsdale News
Bairnsdale Courier and North Gippsland District Advertiser	Bairnsdale	No	defunct	1870–1879	Later known as the Bairnsdale Liberal News and North Gippsland District Advertiser
Bairnsdale Liberal News and North Gippsland District Advertiser	Bairnsdale	No	defunct	1879–1882	Later merged with the Bruthen Chronicle to form the Bairnsdale and Bruthen News
Bairnsdale News	Bairnsdale	No	defunct	1895–1910	Other edition: Bairnsdale Courier
Ballan and Blackwood Reporter and Gordon and Edgerton and Blakeville Advertiser	Ballan	No	defunct	1873	
Ballan/Moorabool News	Ballan	No	defunct	1996	Later known as Ballan Moorabool Buninyong News
Ballan Moorabool Buninyong News	Ballan	No	defunct	1996–1998	Later known as Ballan News
Ballan News	Ballan	No	defunct	1957–1965	Later known as the Ballan Times
Ballan News	Ballan	No	defunct	1998–2007	Merged with the Bacchus Marsh News to form the Moorabool News
Ballan Times	Ballan	No	defunct	1899–1957	Later known as the Ballan News
Ballan Times	Ballan	No	defunct	1965–1966	Later known as Haddon's Foodmarket News
Ballan Times and Blackwood, Blakeville and Myrniong Standard	Ballan	No	defunct	1893–1895	Later known as the Ballan Times and Egerton, Gordon, Blakeville and Myrniong Standard
Ballan Times and Egerton, Gordon, Blakeville and Myrniong Standard	Ballan	No	defunct	1895–1899	Later known as the Ballan Times
Ballan Times and Gordon, Egerton, Wallace, Millbrook and Blackwood Advertiser	Ballan	No	defunct	1890–1893	Later known as the Ballan Times and Blackwood, Blakeville and Myrniong Standard
Ballan Weekly News	Ballan	No	defunct	1966–1995	
Ballarat Courier	Ballarat	No	defunct	1867	Later known as the Ballarat Courier and District Mining and General Reporter
Ballarat Courier	Ballarat	No	defunct	1869–1944	Later known as the Courier (Ballarat)
Ballarat Courier and District Mining and General Reporter	Ballarat	No	defunct	1867–1869	Later known as the Ballarat Courier
Ballarat Star	Ballarat	No	defunct	1865–1924	Absorbed by the Ballarat Courier
Ballarat Sun and Mining Journal	Ballarat	No	defunct	1865	Previously known as the Sun (Ballarat)
Ballarat Times	Ballarat	No	defunct	1856–1859	Later knwon as the Times (Ballarat)
The Ballarat Times and Buninyong and Creswick's Creek Advertiser	Ballarat	No	defunct	1854–1857	
Ballarat Times and Southern Cross	Ballarat	No	defunct	1855–1856	Later known as the Ballarat Times
Ballarat Times News Group	Torquay	No	current	2018–	Previously known as the Miner News
Ballarat Trumpeter	Ballarat	No	defunct	1855–1856	Later became the Ballarat Standard
Balwyn and Box Hill Observer	Elsternwick	No	defunct	1953–1955	Later known as the Box Hill Observer
The Banner	Melbourne	Yes	defunct	1853–1854	
Banner of Belfast	Belfast	No	defunct	1855–1876	
Banter	Burwood	No	defunct	1975–1976	Later known as Pandora's Box
Banyule and Nillumbik Weekly	Briar Hill	No	defunct	2010–2012	Merged with the Weekly Review (Heidelberg and Diamond Valley) to form the Weekly Review (Ivanhoe and Valley)
Barwon View	Geelong	No	defunct	1994–1995	
The Battler	Melbourne	Yes	defunct	1972–1985	Later known as the International Socialist
Baw Baw Advertiser	Warragul	No	defunct	2016	
Baw Baw Citizen	Warragul	No	defunct	2017–2018	Previously known as the Warragul and Baw Baw Citizen
Baw Baw Shire and West Gippsland Trader	Warragul	No	defunct	1997–2020	Previously known as the West Gippsland Trader
Bayonet	Melbourne	Yes	defunct	1919–1921	Later known as Sporting life and "The Bayonet"
Bayside Advertiser	Cheltenham	No	defunct	1999–2001	Later known as the Bayside Leader
Bayside Leader	Cheltenham	No	defunct	2001–2020	Previously known as the Bayside Advertiser
Bayside Review Local	Docklands	No	defunct	2012–2013	Merged with the Weekly Review (Bayside) and the Port Phillip Review Local to become the Weekly Review (Bayside and Port Phillip)
Bayside Southern Cross	Carlton	No	defunct	1998–1999	Later known as the Melbourne Weekly with Bayside Southern Cross
Bayside Times	Hampton	No	defunct	1987–1996	
Beacon	Melbourne	Yes	defunct	1893–1900	
Bealiba Times	Bealiba	No	defunct	1909–1931	
Bear's Circular and Rural Economist	Melbourne	Yes	defunct	1858–1860	Later known as the Economist
Bear's Weekly Circular and Rural Economist	Melbourne	Yes	defunct	1858	Later known as Bear's Circular and Rural Economist
The Bee	Fitzroy	No	defunct	1864	
Beeac Advocate and Weering and Warrion Advertiser	Beeac	No	defunct	1901–1902	
Beechworth and District News	Beechworth	No	defunct	1930–1933	Absorbed by the Ovens and Murray Advertiser
Belfast Gazette	Belfast	No	defunct	1876–1890	Later known as the Port Fairy Gazette
Belfast Gazette and Portland and Warnambool Advertiser	Belfast	No	defunct	1849–1876	Later merged with the Banner of Belfast to form the Belfast Gazette
Bellarine Echo	Geelong	No	defunct	2002–2013	Merged with the Ocean Grove Echo and the Surf Coast Echo to become the Echo (Geelong)
Bellarine Herald	Portarlington	No	defunct	1916–1920	Previously known as the Bellarine Herald and Drysdale, Portarlington, St Leonards and Clifton Springs Gazette
Bellarine Herald and Drysdale, Portarlington, St Leonards and Clifton Springs Gazette	Portarlington	No	defunct	1896–1916	Later known as the Bellarine Herald
Bellarine Peninsula Echo	Ocean Grove	No	defunct	1966–1984	Splits to form the Echo (Bellarine ed) and the Echo (Otway ed)
Bellarine Peninsula Independent	Geelong	No	defunct	2008–2014	
Bellarine and Surf Coast Echo	Geelong	No	defunct	2014–2020	Previously known as the Echo (Geelong)
Bell's Life in Victoria and Sporting Chronicle	Melbourne	Yes	defunct	1857–1868	Absorbed by The Australasian
Benalla City Ensign	Benalla	No	defunct	1986–1988	Later known as the Benalla Ensign
Benalla City Press	Benalla	No	defunct	1985–1986	Later known as the Benalla City Ensign
Benalla Ensign	Benalla	No	defunct	1938–1986	Later merged with the Northeast Ensign to form the Benalla and Northeast Ensign
Benalla Ensign	Benalla	No	current	1988–	Previously known as the Benalla City Ensign
Benalla Ensign and Farmer's and Squatter's Journal	Benalla	No	defunct	1868–1872	
Benalla and Northeast Ensign	Benalla	No	defunct	1986	Absorbed by the Benalla City Press
Benalla Standard	Benalla	No	defunct	1876–1967	Later absorbed by the Benalla Ensign
Benambra and Bogong Advertiser	Yackandandah	No	defunct	1896–1907	Later known as the Yackandandah Times
Bendigo Advertiser	Bendigo	No	defunct	1853–2003	Later known as the Advertiser (Bendigo)
Bendigo Advertiser	Bendigo	No	current	2010–	Previously known as the Advertiser (Bendigo)
Bendigo Bulletin	Sandhurst	No	defunct	1884	
Bendigo Evening News	Sandhurst	No	defunct	1851–1893	
Bendigo Evening Star	Sandhurst	No	defunct	1871–1874	
Bendigo Free Press	Bendigo	No	defunct	1935–1936	
Bendigo Homes and Property	Bendigo	No	defunct	1997–1998	Later known as the Bendigo Weekly
Bendigo Independent	Bendigo	No	defunct	1862–1918	Later absorbed by the Bendigo Advertiser
Bendigo Mercury	Sandhurst	No	defunct	1858–1860	
Bendigo Miner	Bendigo	No	defunct	2007–2012	Absorbed by the Bendigo Advertiser
Bendigonian	Bendigo	No	defunct	1895–1919	Later known as the Bendigonian and Northern Victorian
Bendigonian and Northern Victorian	Bendigo	No	defunct	1919–1920	Previously known as the Bendigonian
Bendigo Star	Sandhurst	No	defunct	1871–1872	
Bendigo Times	Bendigo	No	current	2021–	
Bendigo Times and Sandhurst General Advertiser	Bendigo	No	defunct	1854	
Bendigo Weekly	Bendigo	No	current	1998–	
Bentleigh Echo	Camberwell	No	defunct	1953–1954	
Bentleigh News	Cheltenham	No	defunct	1939–1965	Merged with the Ormond News, the Bentleigh Standard, and the City of Moorabbin News Pictorial to form the City of Moorabbin Standard News Pictorial
Bentleigh, Ormond, McKinnon Southern Cross	Prahran	No	defunct	1992–1993	Related to the Brighton, Hampton, Sandringham Southern Cross
Bentleigh Standard	Bentleigh	No	defunct	1949–1965	Merged with the Ormond News, the Bentleigh News, and the City of Moorabbin News Pictorial to form the City of Moorabbin Standard News Pictorial
Berringa Herald	Kaleno	No	defunct	1903–1922	
Berwick City News	Pakenham	No	defunct	1987–1994	Later known as the Berwick News
Berwick County Times	Berwick	No	defunct	1919–1934	Later known as the Times
Berwick and District Journal	Dandenong	No	defunct	1994–1995	Later known as the City of Casey Journal
Berwick and District Journal	Dandenong	No	defunct	2003–2010	Later known as the Casey Weekly Berwick
Berwick Independent	Hastings	No	defunct	1995	
Berwick Journal	Berwick	No	defunct	1989–1993	Later known as the Berwick Weekend Journal
Berwick Leader	Dandenong	No	defunct	1994–2002	Later known as the Berwick Pakenham Leader
Berwick Leader	Cranbourne	No	defunct	2002–2016	Previously known as the Berwick Pakenham Leader
Berwick News	Pakenham	No	defunct	1995–1996	Later known as the News, Berwick
Berwick and Pakenham Advertiser	Dandenong	No	defunct	1990–1991	
Berwick Pakenham Leader	Cranbourne	No	defunct	2002–2003	Later splits to form the Pakenham Leader, and the Berwick Leader
Berwick-Pakenham Gazette	Pakenham	No	defunct	1994–1998	Later splits to form the Gazette, Berwick and the Gazette, Pakenham
Berwick-Pakenham Gazette	Pakenham	No	current	2012–	Previously known as the Gazette, Berwick-Pakenham
Berwick-Pakenham Times	Berwick	No	defunct	1979–1989	Later known as the Berwick Journal
Berwick Shire News and Pakenham and Cranbourne Gazette	Berwick	No	defunct	1909–1917	
Berwick Star News	Pakenham	No	current	2017–	Previously known as the News, Berwick
Berwick Weekend Journal	Dandenong	No	defunct	1993–1994	Merged with the Journal (Dandenong) to form the Dandenong and District Journal
Beulah Record and Mallee Advocate	Beulah	No	defunct	1894–1914	
Beulah Standard and Mallee and Wimmer Advertiser	Beulah	No	defunct	1915–1940	
Beyond India : Monthly	Lower Templestowe	No	defunct	2006–2019	
Birchip Advertiser and Mallee Agriculturist	Birchip	No	defunct	1891–1912	Later known as the Birchip Advertiser and Watchem Sentinel
Birchip Advertiser and Watchem Sentinel	Birchip	No	defunct	1912–1945	Previously known as the Birchip Advertiser and Mallee Agriculturalist
Birregurra Mail	Birregurra	No	current	1987–	
Birregurra Times	Birregurra	No	defunct	1918–1922	
Birregurra and Winchelsea Star and Lorne Mercury	Birregurra	No	defunct	1889–1891	
Bi-weekly No!!!	Melbourne	Yes	defunct	1917	
Blackburn and Mitcham Reporter	Box Hill	No	defunct	1931–1945	Later known as the Nunawading Reporter
Black Rock News	Cheltenham	No	defunct	1939–1946	Merged with the Sandringham News and the Hampton News to form the News (Sandringham)
Blade	Melbourne	Yes	defunct	1890–1891	
BnewS	Abbotsford	No	defunct	2000–2008	
Bohemia	Melbourne	Yes	defunct	1890–1892	Later known as Bohemian
Bohemian	Melbourne	Yes	defunct	1892	Previously known as Bohemia
Bollywood Times	Bentleigh	No	defunct	2011–2012	
Boolarra Link	Boolarra	No	current	1982–	
Boomerang	Melbourne	Yes	defunct	1894	
Boort and Quambatook Standard-Times	Boort	No	defunct	1962–1996	Later merged with the Wedderburn and Inglewood Express to form the Loddon Times
Boort Standard	Boort	No	defunct	1901–1903	Merged with the Quambatook Herald to form the Boort Standard and Quambatook Herald
Boort Standard	Boort	No	defunct	1926–1961	Later merged with the Quambatook Times to form the Boort Standard and Quambatook Times
Boort Standard and Pyramid Hill Gazette	Boort	No	defunct	1887–1901	Later known as the Boort Standard
Boort Standard and Quambatook Herald	Boort	No	defunct	1903–1915	Later known as the Northern District Standard
Boort Standard and Quambatook Times	Boort	No	defunct	1961–1962	Later known as the Boort and Quambatook Standard-Times
Border Post, Echuca, Moama and Murray River Advertiser	Moama	No	defunct	1893–1896	Absorbed by the Riverine Herald
Boroondara Review Local	Docklands	No	defunct	2012–2013	Previously known as the Melbourne Weekly magazine
Boroondara Standard	Hawthorn	No	defunct	1884–1895	Later known as the Hawthorn and Boroondara Standard
Boroondara Standard and Bulleen, Nunawading and Lilydale Advertiser	Hawthorn	No	defunct	1871–1884	Later known as the Boroondara Standard
Borough of Carrum News	Cheltenham	No	defunct	1922–1925	Absorbed by the Carrum Borough Gazette
Box Hill and Camberwell Express	Kew	No	defunct	1879–1894	Absorbed by the Eastern Suburbs Gazette
Box Hill Community News	Box Hill	No	defunct	1951–1953	
Box Hill Gazette	Blackburn	No	defunct	1993–1995	Merged with the City of Nunawading Gazette to form the Whitehorse Gazette
Box Hill Gazette	Ringwood	No	defunct	1967–1978	Absorbed by the Progress Press (Glen Iris)
Box Hill Observer	Brighton	No	defunct	1955–1957	Later known as the Observer (Box Hill edition)
Box Hill Post	Ferntree Gully	No	defunct	1993–1995	Merged with the Nunawading Post to form the Whitehorse Post
Box Hill Reporter	Box Hill	No	defunct	1925–1964	Later known as the Blackburn and Mitcham Reporter
Breakway	Seaford	No	defunct	1973–1978	
The Brentwood 'Press'	South Yarra	No	defunct	1937	
Bridge	Koondrook	No	current	1930–	Previously known as the Koondrook & Barham Bridge and Cohuna Advocate
The Bridge	Yarram	No	current	2020–	
Bridgewater News	Fitzroy	No	defunct	2003–2005	
Bright Advocate	Melbourne	Yes	defunct	1889	
Bright Observer	Bright	No	defunct	2005–2013	Previously known as the Alpine Observer (Bright)
Brighton edition of the Toorak Times	Melbourne	Yes	defunct	1974	Previously known as the Toorak Times (Brighton edition)
Brighton Hampton Sandringham Southern Cross	Prahran	No	defunct	1989–1994	Later known as the Southern Cross, Brighton, Hampton, Sandringham
Brighton Independent, Caulfield and Moorabbin Municipal Gazette	North Brighton	No	defunct	1894–1895	
Brighton News	Cheltenham	No	defunct	1922–1923	
Brighton News	Brighton	No	defunct	1947–1953	
Brighton Rag	Brighton	No	defunct	1983	
Brighton Southern Cross	Brighton	No	defunct	1879–1936	Later known as the Southern Cross
Brighton Southern Cross	Brighton	No	defunct	1950–1959	Later known as the Southern Cross (Southern ed)
Brighton Southern Cross	North Brighton	No	defunct	1957–1959	Later known as the Southern Cross (North Brighton)
Brighton Southern Cross	Brighton	No	defunct	1986–1988	Later known as the Brighton Hampton Sandringham Southern Cross
Brighton Times	Melbourne	Yes	defunct	1973	Later known as the Toorak Times (Brighton edition)
Brimbank Independent	Sunshine	No	defunct	1995–1999	Absorbed by the Advocate (Brimbank)
Brimbank Leader	Northcote	No	defunct	2001–2016	Previously known as the Brimbank Messenger
Brimbank Messenger	Glenroy	No	defunct	1995–2001	Later known as the Brimbank Leader
Brimbank and North West Star Weekly	Airport West	No	current	2014–	Previously known as the Brimbank and North West Weekly, the Star, Keilor, Taylors Lakes, Sydenham, and the Star, Sunshine, Ardeer, Albion (merged)
Brimbank and North West Weekly	Airport West	No	defunct	2013–2014	Merged with the Star, Keilor, Taylors Lakes, Sydenham, and the Star, Sunshine, Ardeer, Albion to form the Brimbank and North West Star Weekly
Brimbank's Own	Moonee Ponds	No	defunct	2001	
Brimbank Weekly	Airport West	No	defunct	2010–2013	Merged with the North West Weekly to form the Brimbank and North West Weekly
Broadford Courier	Broadford	No	defunct	1891–1893	Later known as the Broadford Courier and Reedy Creek Times
Broadford Courier	Broadford	No	defunct	1916–1978	Later absorbed by the Kilmore Free Press
Broadford Courier and Reedy Creek Times	Broadford	No	defunct	1891	Later known as the Broadford Courier
Broadford Courier and Reedy Creek Times	Broadford	No	defunct	1893–1916	Later merged with the Broadford Courier
Broadmeadows Camp Sentry	Broadmeadows	No	defunct	1917	
Broadmeadows and Keilor Observer	Glenroy	No	defunct	1956–1969	Merged with the St Albans and Outer Western Observer to become the Keilor Messenger
Broadmeadows Observer	Glenroy	No	defunct	1969–1995	Later known as the Hume Observer, and the Moreland Observer
Brunswick and Coburg Advertiser	North Melbourne	Yes	defunct	1882–1888	
Brunswick and Coburg Courier	Moreland	No	defunct	1933–1934	
Brunswick and Coburg Gazette	Moonee Ponds	No	defunct	1928–1933	Merged with the Courier (Coburg, Vic.) to form the Brunswick and Coburg Courier
Brunswick and Coburg Leader	Brunswick	No	defunct	1913–1929	Previously known as the Brunswick Medium, and the Coburg Leader
Brunswick and Coburg Medium and East Bourke Boroughs Advertiser	Brunswick	No	defunct	1885–1891	Later known as the Brunswick Medium
Brunswick and Coburg Reformer and East Bourke Boroughs Advertiser	Brunswick	No	defunct	1886–1887	Later known as the Reformer and Northern Suburbs Advertiser
Brunswick and Coburg Star	Brunswick	No	defunct	1909–1916	
Brunswick Guardian	Brunswick	No	defunct	1933–1943	
Brunswick Medium	Brunswick	No	defunct	1891–1913	Later merged with the Coburg Leader to form the Brunswick and Coburg Leader
Brunswick Moreland Leader	Northcote	No	defunct	2001–2003	Merged with the Coburg Moreland Leader to form the Moreland Leader
Brunswick News	Moreland	No	defunct	1924–1925	
Brunswick and Pentridge Press and East Bourke Advertiser	Brunswick	No	defunct	1858–1861	
Brunswick Sentinel	Northcote	No	defunct	1966–1995	Later known as the Moreland Sentinel
Bruthen Chronicle	Bruthen	No	defunct	1880–1882	Merged with the Bairnsdale Liberal News and North Gippsland District Advertiser to form the Bairnsdale and Bruthen News
Bruthen and Tambo Times	Bruthen	No	defunct	1903–1957	Previously known as the Tambo and Orbost Times and Haunted Stream and Buchan News
The Bugle	Hampton	No	defunct	1985–1987	Previously known as the Hampton Bugle
Bulleen, Boroondara, Nunawading, Hawthorn and Kew Express	Hawthorn	No	defunct	1888–1890	Later known as the Hawthorn and Kew Express
Bulleen, Boroondara, Nunawading, Kew and Hawthorn Express	Kew	No	defunct	1882–1888	Later known as the Bulleen, Boroondara, Nunawading, Hawthorn and Kew Express
Buloke Times	Donald	No	current	1995–	
Buninyong Telegraph	Buninyong	No	defunct	1854–1891	Later known as the Buninyong Telegraph and Suburban Weekly
Buninyong Telegraph and Suburban Weekly	Buninyong	No	defunct	1891–1908	Previously known as the Buninyong Telegraph
Bunyip Free Press and Berwick Shire Guardian	Bunyip	No	defunct	1909–1915	
Bunyip and Garfield Express: Nar-Nar-Goon, Tynong, Pakenham and Bunyip South Representative	Bunyip	No	defunct	1883–1979	
Burwood Observer	North Brighton	No	defunct	1959	Absorbed by the Observer (Box Hill edition)
Buset	Hawthorn	No	defunct	2005–2021	
Business Daily	Malvern	No	defunct	1987	
Business and Employment Weekly	Melbourne	Yes	defunct	1983	
The Buzz	Murrumbeena	No	defunct	1931–1933	
B. Vockler (authentic) extraordinary cup edition	Melbourne	Yes	defunct	1932	Later known as B. Vockler (authentic) Turf Wasp
B. Vockler Turf and Sporting Life	Melbourne	Yes	defunct	1932–1942	Previously known as B. Vockler (authentic) Turf Wasp
B. Vockler (authentic) Turf Wasp	Melbourne	Yes	defunct	1932	Later known as B. Vockler Turf and Sporting Life
B. W. Byron's Centennial Gazette and Weekly News	Melbourne	Yes	defunct	1889	

== C ==
Newspaper	Town / suburb	Melbourne region	Status	Years of publication	Notes
Camberwell and Canterbury Standard	Hawthorn	No	defunct	1917–1920	Merged with the Hawthorn, Kew, Camberwell Citizen to become the Hawthorn and Camberwell Citizen
Camberwell Chronicle	East Malvern	No	defunct	1950–1951	Later known as the Camberwell and Glenferrie Chronicle
Camberwell Citizen	Glenferrie	No	defunct	1924–1926	Previously known as the Hawthorn and Camberwell Citizen
Camberwell City Mirror	East Kew	No	defunct	1963–1965	
Camberwell Free Press	Melbourne	Yes	defunct	1927–1968	Later known as the Free Press (Camberwell)
Camberwell Free Press	Camberwell	No	defunct	1980–1983	Later known as the Free Press (Camberwell)
Camberwell and Glenferrie Chronicle	Elsternwick	No	defunct	1951–1952	Previously known as the Camberwell Chronicle
Camberwell and Hawthorn Advertiser	Camberwell	No	defunct	1895–1920	Previously known as the Hawthorn Advertiser
Camberwell News Pictorial	Cheltenham	No	defunct	1963–1964	Merged with the Eastern Suburbs Standard to form the Greater Eastern Suburbs Standard
The Campaspe : a stream of news and literary items	Melbourne	Yes	defunct	1889	
Campaspe News	Rochester	No	current	1990–	Previously known as the Campaspe Valley News
Campaspe Valley News	Rochester	No	defunct	1969–1990	Later known as the Campaspe News
Camperdown Chronicle	Camperdown	No	current	1877–	Previously known as the Camperdown Chronicle and Western District General Advertiser
Camperdown Chronicle and Western District General Advertiser	Camperdown	No	defunct	1874–1877	Later known as the Camperdown Chronicle
Camperdown Herald	Camperdown	No	defunct	1908–1936	Previously known as the Camperdown Herald and Terang and Cobden Advertiser
Camperdown Herald and Terang and Cobden Advertiser	Camperdown	No	defunct	1903–1908	Later known as the Camperdown Herald
Camperdown Times and Hampden and Heytesbury Advertiser	Camperdown	No	defunct	1895–1897	
Canterbury Courier	Surrey Hills	No	defunct	1949–1950	
Carisbrook Mercury	Carisbrook	No	current	2001–	
Carlton and Fitzroy City News	South Melbourne	Yes	defunct	1991–1992	Previously known as the Toorak Times (Melbourne City edition)
Carlton Hotham Brunswick Flemington Observer	Carlton	No	defunct	1873	
Carlton News	Carlton	No	defunct	1969–1971	Later known as the Melbourne Times : Carlton, Parkville, North Carlton, Princes Hill, Fitzroy and East Melbourne
Carlton Times	Carlton	No	defunct	1937–1939	Later known as the Times (Carlton)
Carlton Times	North Fitzroy	No	defunct	1948–1949	Previously known as the Times (Carlton)
Carnegie Courier	North Brighton	No	defunct	1949–1959	Merged with the Prahran News, the Caulfield-Elsternwick Advertiser, and the St Kilda News to form the Southern Advertiser
Carnegie-East Malvern Progress Press	Ashburton	No	defunct	1954–1955	Absorbed by the Progress Press
Carnival Times	Sandringham	No	defunct	1931	
Carrum Borough Gazette	Frankston	No	defunct	1923–1929	Later known as the City of Chelsea Gazette
Carrum Borough Gazette and the Chelsea, Carrum, Edithvale and Aspendale Advocate	Frankston	No	defunct	1922–1923	Later known as the Carrum Borough Gazette
Carrum Chronicle	Mordialloc	No	defunct	2017–2018	
Casey and Cardinia Free Press	Warragul	No	defunct	2017	
Casey Weekly	Wendouree	No	defunct	2013	Previously known as the Pakenham Weekly, and the Casey Weekly Berwick (merged)
Casey Weekly Berwick	Dandenong	No	defunct	2010–2013	Merged with the Pakenham Weekly to form the Casey Weekly
Casey Weekly Cranbourne	Dandenong	No	defunct	2010–2013	Previously known as the Cranbourne Journal
Casterton Free Press and Glenelg Shire Advertiser	Casterton	No	defunct	1905–1922	Absorbed by the Casterton News and the Merino and Sandford Record
Casterton News	Casterton	No	defunct	1939–1972	Later known as the Western Advertiser
Casterton News	Casterton	No	defunct	1989–2024	Previously known as the Western Advertiser
Casterton News and the Merino and Sandford Record	Casterton	No	defunct	1905–1939	Later known as the Casterton News
Casterton News and Western Shires Advertiser	Casterton	No	defunct	1875–1884	Later known as the Casterton News, Western Shires Advertiser and the Merino and Sandford Record
Casterton News, Western Shires Advertiser and the Merino and Sandford Record	Casterton	No	defunct	1884–1905	Later known as the Casterton News and the Merino and Sandford Record
Casterton Times and Sandford, Merino, Strathdownie and Branxholme Mercury	Casterton	No	defunct	1891	
Castlemaine Advertiser	Castlemaine	No	defunct	1862	Previously known as the Castlemaine Advertiser and County of Talbot Chronicle
Castlemaine Advertiser and County of Talbot Chronicle	Castlemaine	No	defunct	1858–1862	Later known as the Castlemaine Advertiser
Castlemaine Daily News and Chewton, Maldon, Guildford, Fryerstown, Newstead, Muckleford, Yandoit, Vaughan, Tarilta, Metcalfe, Malmsbury, and Taradale Advertiser	Castlemaine	No	defunct	1868	Later known as the Daily News (Castlemaine)
Castlemaine Leader	Castlemaine	No	defunct	1885–1916	Previously known as the Castlemaine Leader and Advocate for Chewton, Campbell's Creek, Fryers, Guildford, Maldon, Muckleford and Taradale
Castlemaine Leader and Advocate for Chewton, Campbell's Creek, Fryers, Guildford, Maldon, Muckleford and Taradale	Castlemaine	No	defunct	1883–1885	Later known as the Castlemaine Leader
Castlemaine Mail	Castlemaine	No	current	1917–	Previously known as the Mount Alexander Mail
Castlemaine Representative and Chronicle for Chewton, Campbell's Creek, Fyers, Guildford, Maldon, Muckleford and Taradale	Castlemaine	No	defunct	1870–1883	Later known as the Castlemaine Leader and Advocate for Chewton, Campbell's Creek, Fryers, Guildford, Maldon, Muckleford and Taradale
Castlemaine Yarner and Diggers' Gazette	Castlemaine	No	defunct	1853–1854	
Catholic Worker	Melbourne	Yes	defunct	1936–1976	
Caulfield Advertiser	Elsternwick	No	defunct	1948	Merged with the Glenhuntly Advertiser and the Elsternwick Advertiser to form the Caulfield-Elsternwick Advertiser
Caulfield/Bentleigh Southern Cross	Carlton	No	defunct	1999	Previously known as the Southern Cross, Caulfield/Bentleigh
Caulfield-Elsternwick Advertiser	Elsternwick	No	defunct	1949–1959	Merged with the Prahran News, the Carnegie Courier, and the St Kilda News to form the Southern Advertiser
Caulfield and Elsternwick Leader	Brighton	No	defunct	1888–1902	Previously known as the Elsternwick Leader
Caulfield and Elsternwick Mercury	St Kilda	No	defunct	1901–1902	
Caulfield and Elsternwick Star	Elsternwick	No	defunct	1887–1890	
Caulfield and Elsternwick Times	North Brighton	No	defunct	1893–1906	Later known as the St Kilda and Caulfield Southern Cross
Caulfield Glen Eira Leader	Armadale	No	defunct	1995–2020	Previously known as the Caulfield Leader
Caulfield Leader	Armadale	No	defunct	1994–1995	Later known as the Caulfield Glen Eira Leader
Caulfield-Malvern Progress	Oakleigh	No	defunct	1988	Later known as Malvern-Caulfield Progress
Caulfield Mercury and Glenhuntly Guardian	Caulfield	No	defunct	1936–1937	
Caulfield News	Cheltenham	No	defunct	1919–1924	
Caulfield Southern Cross	Prahran	No	defunct	1986–1994	Later known as the Southern Cross, Caulfield
Caulfield-St Kilda Leader	Armadale	No	defunct	1993–1994	Splits to form the Caulfield Leader, and the Port Phillip Leader
CBD News	Docklands	No	current	2014–	
Central Victorian News and Review	Castlemaine	No	defunct	1988–1989	
Chadstone Progress	Northcote	No	defunct	1960–1983	Later known as Regional Chadstone Progress
Champion	Melbourne	Yes	defunct	1895–1897	
Charles Swan's Federal Journal and Australian Review	Melbourne	Yes	defunct	1889	
Charlton Independent	Charlton	No	defunct	1885–1893	Absorbed by the East Charlton Tribune and Lower Avoca Representative
Charlton Tribune	Charlton	No	defunct	1940–1981	Merged with the St Arnaud Mercury to form the North Central News
Charlton Tribune and Lower Avoca Representative	Charlton	No	defunct	1926–1940	Later known as the Charlton Tribune
Chelsea Independent	Hastings	No	defunct	1998–2004	Later known as Chelsea, Mordialloc, Mentone Independent
Chelsea, Mordialloc, Mentone Independent	Hastings	No	defunct	2004–2010	Previously known as the Chelsea Independent
Chelsea, Mordialloc, Mentone News	Hastings	No	current	2014–	Previously known as the Chelsea - Mordialloc News
Chelsea - Mordialloc News	Hastings	No	defunct	2012–2013	Later known as Chelsea, Mordialloc, Mentone News
Chelsea Post	Mornington	No	defunct	1949–1950	Later known as the Post (Chelsea edition)
Cheltenham Leader	North Brighton	No	defunct	1888–1902	Previously known as the Cheltenham Leader and District Record
Cheltenham Leader and District Record	Brighton	No	defunct	1887–1888	Later known as the Cheltenham Leader
Cheltenham Leader and East Brighton, South Brighton, Mentone, Mordialloc, Oakleigh, Sandringham, Balaclava, Elsternwick and Caulfield Record	Brighton	No	defunct	1887	Later known as the Cheltenham Leader and Mentone and Mordialloc Guardian
Cheltenham Leader and Mentone and Mordialloc Guardian	Brighton	No	defunct	1887	Later known as the Cheltenham Leader and District Record
Chiltern and Barnawartha Guardian	Chiltern	No	defunct	1887	
Chiltern and Howlong Times and Mining, Commercial and Agricultural Directory	Beechworth	No	defunct	1886–1889	Later known as the Chiltern and Howlong Times and Ovens Register
Chiltern and Howlong Times and Ovens Register	Beechworth	No	defunct	1889–1918	Previously known as the Chiltern and Howlong Times and Mining, Commercial and Agricultural Directory
Chiltern Leader	Chiltern	No	defunct	1896–1898	
Chiltern Standard and Murray Valley Mining Reporter	Chiltern	No	defunct	1859–1860	Later known as the Federal Standard and Murray Valley Mining Reporter
China View	Box Hill	No	defunct	2007	
Chinese Advertiser	Ballarat	No	defunct	1856	
Chinese Australian	Melbourne	Yes	defunct	1998–2001	
Chinese Bridge (Lian he shi bao)	Melbourne	Yes	defunct	2006–2018	Previously known as Lian he yue bao (Chinese Bridge)
Chinese Bridge (Lian ye yue bao)	Melbourne	Yes	defunct	2004–2006	Later known as Lian he shi bao (Chinese Bridge)
Chinese Bulletin	Prahran	No	defunct	1990–1993	
Chinese Business Life	Melbourne	Yes	defunct	1999–2001	Supplement to the Australian Chinese Age
Chinese Commercial Weekly	Port Melbourne	No	defunct	2019–2020	Previously known as Chinese Property, Investment
Chinese Commercial Weekly and Property Guide	Preston	No	defunct	2000–2009	
Chinese Community Times	Brunswick	No	defunct	1995	
Chinese Melbourne Daily	Collingwood	No	defunct	2001–2023	
Chinese Melbourne Times	Collingwood	No	defunct	2001–2003	
Chinese Property, Investment	Melbourne	Yes	defunct	2016–2018	Later known as Chinese Commercial Weekly
Chinese Property Weekly	Melbourne	Yes	defunct	2010–2017	
Chinese Times	Melbourne	Yes	defunct	1902–1922	
Chinese Weekend	Melbourne	Yes	defunct	2010–2019	
Chinese Weekly	Richmond	No	defunct	1996–2016	
Chronicle	Windsor	No	defunct	1889–1891	Later known as the Chronicle, South Yarra Gazette, Toorak Times and Malvern Standard
The Chronicle	Wangaratta	No	defunct	1983–2003	Later known as the Wangaratta Chronicle
Chronicle Despatch	Wangaratta	No	defunct	1959–1983	Later known as the Chronicle (Wangaratta)
Chronicle, South Yarra Gazette, Toorak times and Malvern Standard	Prahran	No	defunct	1891–1893	Later known as the Prahran Chronicle
Churchill and District News	Churchill	No	current	2002–	
Church Scene	North Melbourne	Yes	defunct	1971–1997	Previously known as the Anglican (Sydney)
The Circle	Melbourne	Yes	defunct	1919–1955	
City	East Melbourne	Yes	defunct	2008–2010	Later known as City Weekly
City Extra	Blackburn	No	defunct	1984–1987	
City Free Press	Flemington	No	defunct	1909–1910	Previously known as the West Bourke Times
City of Box Hill Gazette	Box Hill	No	defunct	1965	Merged with the Eastern Times to form the Eastern Times Gazette
City of Casey Journal	Dandenong	No	defunct	1995–1997	Merged with the Dandenong and District Journal to form the Dandenong and Casey Journal
City of Chelsea Gazette	Cheltenham	No	defunct	1929	Later known as the City of Chelsea News
City of Chelsea News	Cheltenham	No	defunct	1929–1966	Merged with the Mordialloc City News to form the Mordialloc-Chelsea News Pictorial
City Limits	Melbourne	Yes	defunct	1991	
City of Moorabbin News	Cheltenham	No	defunct	1950–1952	Later known as the Moorabbin News
City of Moorabbin News	Cheltenham	No	defunct	1957–1959	Later known as the City of Moorabbin News Pictorial
City of Moorabbin News Pictorial	Cheltenham	No	defunct	1959–1965	Merged with the Ormond News, the Bentleigh News, and the Bentleigh Standard to form the City of Moorabbin Standard News Pictorial
City of Moorabbin News Pictorial	Cheltenham	No	defunct	1965–1976	Merged with the City of Moorabbin Standard News Pictorial to form the City of Moorabbin Standard
City of Moorabbin Standard	Cheltenham	No	defunct	1976–1980	Later known as the Moorabbin Standard
City of Moorabbin Standard News Pictorial	Cheltenham	No	defunct	1965–1976	Merged with the City of Moorabbin News Pictorial to form the City of Moorabbin Standard
City News and Evening Tribune	Melbourne	Yes	defunct	1874–1875	Previously known as the Evening Tribune
City of Nunawading Gazette	Nunawading	No	defunct	1964–1995	Merged with the Box Hill Gazette to form the Whitehorse Gazette
City of Preston Post-Times	Preston	No	defunct	1978–1988	Later known as the Preston Post-Times
City of Sandringham News : Hampton, Black Rock, Beaumaris	Cheltenham	No	defunct	1925–1937	Later known as the Sandringham News
City Weekly	Melbourne	Yes	defunct	1997–2008	Later known as the City
City Weekly	Docklands	No	defunct	2010–2012	Previously known as the City
The Clarion	Richmond	No	defunct	1980–1985	
Clayton and District Times	Oakleigh	No	defunct	1962–1964	Merged with the Standard (Springvale - Noble Park - Clayton ed), and the South East Suburban Mail to form the Standard Times
Clayton-Springvale-Noble Park Standard	Cheltenham	No	defunct	1956–1960	Merged with the Mercury (Glen Waverley) to form the Dandenong Standard
Clayton-Springvale Standard	Cheltenham	No	defunct	1962	Later known as the Standard (Springvale-Noble Park-Clayton ed)
Clayton Standard	Cheltenham	No	defunct	1962	Merged with the South Eastern Standard News Pictorial to form the Clayton-Springvale Standard
Clifton Hill Leader	Northcote	No	defunct	1888–1889	Later known as the Clifton Hill Leader and Northern Suburbs Advertiser
Clifton Hill Leader and Northern Suburbs Advertiser	Northcote	No	defunct	1889	Previously known as the Clifton Hill Leader
Clifton Hill Times	Carlton	No	defunct	1937–1938	Later known as the Times (Clifton Hill)
C. L. Tischler's National Chronicle and Australian News	Melbourne	Yes	defunct	1889	
Clough's Circular and Pastoral Advertiser	Melbourne	Yes	defunct	1857–1867	
Clunes Gazette	Clunes	No	defunct	1865–1872	Later known as the Clunes Guardian
Clunes Gazette and Mining, Commercial and Agricultural Newspaper	Clunes	No	defunct	1863–1872	Later merged with the Clunes Guardian to form the Clunes Guardian and Gazette
Clunes Guardian	Clunes	No	defunct	1872	Merged with the Clunes Gazette and Mining, Commercial and Agricultural Newspaper to form the Clunes Guardian and Gazette
Clunes Guardian and Gazette	Clunes	No	defunct	1873–1948	Later merged with the Talbot Leader to form the Clunes-Talbot Guardian
Clunes Guardian and Mining and Agricultural Newspaper	Clunes	No	defunct	1863–1871	Later known as the Clunes Guardian
Clunes-Talbot Guardian	Clunes	No	defunct	1948–1966	Previously known as the Clunes Guardian and Gazette, and the Talbot Leader (merged)
Cobden Timboon Coast Times	Camperdown	No	current	2010–	Previously known as the Cobden Times
Cobden Times	Cobden	No	defunct	1918–2010	Later known as the Cobden Timboon Coast Times
Cobden Times and Heytesbury Advertiser	Cobden	No	defunct	1890–1918	Later known as the Cobden Times
Cobram Courier and Yarroweyah, Strathmerton, Katamatite, Burramine and Berrigan News	Cobram	No	defunct	1888–1995	Later known as the Courier (Cobram)
Coburg Advertiser and Campbellfield, Fawkner, Bolingbroke and Newlands Gazette	Brunswick	No	defunct	1890–1902	
Coburg Brunswick Northerner	South Melbourne	Yes	defunct	1987–1991	
Coburg Courier	Kew	No	defunct	1935–1995	Later known as the Moreland Courier
Coburg Leader	Coburg	No	defunct	1890–1913	Later merged with the Brunswick Medium to form the Brunswick and Coburg Leader
Coburg and Moreland Courier	Moreland	No	defunct	1932	Later known as the Courier (Coburg, Vic.)
Coburg Moreland Leader	Northcote	No	defunct	2001–2003	Merged with the Brunswick Moreland Leader to form the Moreland Leader
Coburg and Moreland News	Coburg	No	defunct	1924–1925	
Coburg Quarterly	Melbourne	Yes	defunct	2016–2018	
Cohuna Farmer and Settlers' Weekly	Cohuna	No	defunct	1913	Later known as the Cohuna Farmers' Weekly
Cohuna Farmers' Weekly	Cohuna	No	defunct	1913–1961	Later known as the Northern District Farmers' Weekly
Cohuna Farmers' Weekly	Cohuna	No	defunct	1967–2015	Later merged with the Northern Times to form the Gannawarra Times
Cohuna New Times	Warrnambool	No	defunct	1913	
Colac District Stock and Station Gazette and J. G. Johnstone & Co's Weekly Live Stock Report	Colac	No	defunct	1906–1909	
Colac Extra	Warrnambool	No	defunct	2008–2009	Supplement to the Corangamite Extra
Colac Herald	Colac	No	current	1866–	
Colac Observer and Polwarth, Grenville and Hampden General Advertiser	Colac	No	defunct	1866	Later known as the Colac Observer, Winchelsea, Ondit and Birregurra Guardian and Polwarth, Grenville and Hampden General Advertiser
Colac Observer, Winchelsea, Ondit and Birregurra Guardian and Polwarth, Grenville and Hampden General Advertiser	Colac	No	defunct	1867–1874	Absorbed by the Colac Herald
Colac-Otway Echo	Geelong	No	defunct	2002–2009	Previously known as the Echo (Colac-Otway ed)
Colac Pastoral and Agricultural News	Colac	No	defunct	1908–1913	
Colac Reformer	Colac	No	defunct	1878–1949	Later absorbed by the Colac Herald
Colac Times	Colac	No	defunct	1875–1878	Later known as the Colac Reformer
Coleraine Albion	Coleraine	No	defunct	1962–1976	Later absorbed by the Western Advertiser
Coleraine Albion and Casterton Advertiser	Coleraine	No	defunct	1868–1875	Later known as the Coleraine Albion and Western Advertiser
Coleraine Albion and Western Advertiser	Coleraine	No	defunct	1881–1962	Later known as the Coleraine Albion
Collingwood Advertiser and Observer	Collingwood	No	defunct	1870–1871	Later known as the Advertiser and Observer
Collingwood City News	South Melbourne	Yes	defunct	1991–1993	Previously known as Toorak Times (Melbourne City edition)
Collingwood, Fitzroy, Carlton Courier	Northcote	No	defunct	1971–1976	Later known as the Melbourne Times (Eastern edition)
Collingwood and Fitzroy Courier	Fitzroy	No	defunct	1948–1971	Later known as the Collingwood, Fitzroy, Carlton Courier
Colonial Mining Journal, Railway and Share Gazette	Melbourne	Yes	defunct	1858–1861	
Commonweal and Workers' Advocate	Richmond	No	defunct	1891–1893	
Commonwealth	Melbourne	Yes	defunct	1921	
Computer Week	Prahran	No	defunct	1995–1997	Merged with PC Week to form PC Week Australia
Community News	Moonee Ponds	No	defunct	1989–1996	Splits to form the Community News (Hume Moreland ed) and the Community News (Moonee Valley ed)
Community News (Hume Moreland ed)	Airport West	No	defunct	1996–1998	Later known as the Community News (Moreland Hume ed)
Community News (Moonee Valley ed)	Airport West	No	defunct	1996–2001	Later known as the Moonee Valley Community News
Community News (Moreland ed)	Airport West	No	defunct	1999–2001	Later known as the Moreland Community News
Community News (Moreland Hume ed)	Airport West	No	defunct	1998–1999	Later known as the Community News (Moreland ed)
The Constitution and Ovens Mining Intelligencer	Beechworth	No	defunct	1856–1863	
Continent	Northcote	No	defunct	1973	
Coo-e-e	Melbourne	Yes	defunct	1898–1901	
Coo-e-e Advertiser : a weekly sheet, dull care to cheat	Prahran	No	defunct	1898–1901	
Corio Chronicle, and Western District Advertiser	Geelong	No	defunct	1847–1849	Later known as the Victoria Colonist, and Western District Advertiser
Corio News	Geelong	No	defunct	1968–1970	Later known as the Northern Suburbs News
Corryong Courier	Corryong	No	defunct	1894–1945	Later known as the Corryong Courier and Walwa District News
Corryong Courier	Corryong	No	current	1960–	Previously known as the Corryong Courier and Walwa District News
Corryong Courier and Walwa District News	Corryong	No	defunct	1946–1960	Later known as the Corryong Courier
COTA News	Thornbury	No	defunct	2006–2010	
Country Bulletin	Maryborough	No	defunct	1976–1979	The Wimmera-Mallee Country Bulletin is published monthly as a supplement to regional newspapers: Avoca mail; Boort standard and Quambatook times; Charlton tribune; Farmers weekly, Cohuna; Dimboola banner; Donald Birchip times; Kowree advocate, Edenhope; Hopetoun courier; Wimmera mail-times, Horsham; Jeparit leader; Kaniva times; Northern times, Kerang; Maryborough advertiser; Nhill free press; North west express, Ouyen; Rainbow news; The sentinel, Robinvale; Campaspe Valley news, Rochester; Sea Lake and Wycheproof times-ensign; St. Arnaud mercury; Stawell times-news; Swan Hill guardian; Warracknabeal herald; Wedderburn and Inglewood express
Country Bulletin	Morwell	No	defunct	1976–1979	
Countryman	Melbourne	Yes	defunct	1924–1976	Previously known as the Farmers' Advocate
County of Gladstone Gazette	Dunolly	No	defunct	1893–1895	
The Courier	Ballarat	No	current	1944–	Previously known as the Ballarat Courier
The Courier	Cobram	No	current	1996–	Previously known as the Cobram Courier and Yarroweyah, Strathmerton, Katamatite, Burramine and Berrigan News
The Courier	Coburg	No	defunct	1932–1933	Merged with the Brunswick and Coburg Gazette to form the Brunswick and Coburg Courier
The Courier and Licensed Victuallers' Advocate	Melbourne	Yes	defunct	1899–1900	Previously known as the Licensed Victuallers' Advocate and Sportsman's Guide
The Courier of the Mines	Sandhurst	No	defunct	1855	Later known as the Courier of the Mines and Bendigo Daily Mail
Courier of the Mines and Bendigo Daily Mail	Sandhurst	No	defunct	1856–1857	Previously known as the Courier of the Mines
The Courier : South Melbourne and St. Kilda Advertiser	South Melbourne	Yes	defunct	1894–1900	Later known as the South Melbourne Star
Cranbourne and County Herald	Cranbourne	No	defunct	1893–1902	Later known as the Lang Lang Guardian
Cranbourne Flyer	Rosebud	No	defunct	1990–1991	
Cranbourne Independent	Hastings	No	defunct	1992–2007	Later known as the Cranbourne Journal
Cranbourne Journal	Cranbourne	No	defunct	1979–1982	Absorbed by the Cranbourne Sun
Cranbourne Journal	Dandenong	No	defunct	2007–2010	Later known as the Casey Weekly Cranbourne
Cranbourne Leader	Cranbourne	No	defunct	2001–2020	Previously known as the Cranbourne Sun
Cranbourne News	Pakenham	No	defunct	1995–1996	Later known as the News, Cranbourne
Cranbourne Star News	Pakenham	No	current	2017–	Previously known as the News, Cranbourne
Cranbourne Sun	Koo Wee Rup	No	defunct	1976–2001	Later known as the Cranbourne Leader
Cressy and Lismore Pioneer and Western Plains Representative	Cressy	No	defunct	1910–1941	
Creswick Advertiser	Creswick	No	defunct	1858–1859	Later known as the Creswick and Clunes Advertiser and County of Talbot Agricultural Journal
Creswick Advertiser	Creswick	No	defunct	1899–1994	Merged with the Daylesford Advocate to form the Hepburn Shire Advocate
Creswick Advertiser (Clunes edition)	Creswick	No	defunct	1936	
Creswick Advertiser and County of Talbot Agricultural Journal	Creswick	No	defunct	1871–1899	Later known as the Creswick Advertiser
Creswick Chronicle	Creswick	No	defunct	1855	
Creswick and Clunes Advertiser and County of Talbot Agricultural Journal	Creswick	No	defunct	1859–1870	
Criterion	Melbourne	Yes	defunct	1892	
Cronica	East Melbourne	Yes	defunct	1964–1966	
Croydon Gazette	Mitcham	No	defunct	1970	Local edition of the Ringwood Gazette
Croydon Mail	Ringwood	No	defunct	1939–1967	Merged with the Ringwood Mail to form the Ringwood-Croydon Mail
Croydon Mail	Ringwood	No	defunct	1983–1996	Merged with the Ringwood Mail to form the Maroondah Mail
Croydon Mail and Mount Dandenong Advertiser	Ringwood	No	defunct	1926–1939	Later known as the Croydon Mail
Croydon Mooroolbark Gazette	Croydon	No	defunct	1975–1978	Previously known as the Ringwood-Croydon Gazette
Croydon Post	Lilydale	No	defunct	1988–1995	Merged with the Ringwood Post to form the Maroondah Post
Croydon, Ringwood and Mountain District Post	Mornington	No	defunct	1956–1960	Later known as the Croydon-Ringwood Post
Croydon-Ringwood Post	Box Hill	No	defunct	1960–1961	Later known as the Eastern Post
Croydon and Ringwood Post	Lilydale	No	defunct	1985–1988	Splits to form the Croydon Post, and the Ringwood Post
Cumming and Taylor's Freemans Journal and Farmers' Review	Melbourne	Yes	defunct	1889	
Current	Morwell	No	defunct	2002–2007	

== D ==
Newspaper	Town / suburb	Melbourne region	Status	Years of publication	Notes
Daily Australasian Shipping News	Melbourne	Yes	defunct	1900–1904	Merged with the Shipping Index and Importers and Exporters Journal to form the Daily Shipping Index and Importers and Exporters Journal
Daily Commercial News and Shipping List	Melbourne	Yes	defunct	1921–1975	Previously known as the Daily Shipping Index of Australasia
Daily Mail	Melbourne	Yes	defunct	1921	
Daily Mail (Malvern-Caulfield)	Melbourne	Yes	defunct	1921–1922	Other edition of the Daily Mail
Daily News	Castlemaine	No	defunct	1868–1869	Previously known as the Castlemaine Daily News and Chewton, Maldon, Guildford, Fryerstown, Newstead, Muckleford, Yandoit, Vaughan, Tarilta, Metcalfe, Malmsbury, and Taradale Advertiser
Daily News	East Melbourne	Yes	defunct	1885–1886	
Daily News	Geelong	No	defunct	1858–1859	
Daily News and Chewton, Maldon, Guildford, Newstead, Muckleford, Yandoit, Vaughan, Tarilta, Metcalf, Malmsbury, and Taradale Advertiser	Castlemaine	No	defunct	1865–1868	Later known as the Castlemaine Daily News and Chewton, Maldon, Guildford, Fryerstown, Newstead, Muckleford, Yandoit, Vaughan, Tarilta, Metcalfe, Malmsbury, and Taradale Advertiser
Daily Shipping Gazette	Melbourne	Yes	defunct	1894–1900	Merged with the Australasian Shipping News to form the Daily Australasian Shipping News
Daily Shipping Index of Australasia	Melbourne	Yes	defunct	1907–1920	Later known as the Daily Commercial News and Shipping List
Daily Shipping Index and Importers and Exporters Journal	Melbourne	Yes	defunct	1904–1907	Later known as the Daily Shipping Index of Australasia
Daily Telegraph	Melbourne	Yes	defunct	1869–1892	Absorbed by The Herald
Daily Truth	Melbourne	Yes	defunct	1975	
Dalgety's Review	Melbourne	Yes	defunct	1924–1935	Later known as Rural Review
Dandenong Advertiser	Dandenong	No	defunct	1942–1959	Previously known as the Dandenong Advertiser and Cranbourne, Berwick and Oakleigh Advocate
Dandenong Advertiser and Cranbourne, Berwick and Oakleigh Advocate	Dandenong	No	defunct	1874–1941	Previously known as The Times
Dandenong Berwick Leader	Blackburn	No	defunct	1992–1994	Later splits to form the Berwick Leader, and the Dandenong Leader
Dandenong and Casey Journal	Dandenong	No	defunct	1997	Later known as the Journal (Dandenong)
Dandenong and District Journal	Dandenong	No	defunct	1994–1997	Merged with the City of Casey Journal to form the Dandenong and Casey Journal
Dandenong and District Journal (Berwick ed)	Dandenong	No	defunct	1994	Related to the Dandenong and District Journal
Dandenong Examiner	Dandenong	No	defunct	1988–1990	Later known as the Examiner (Dandenong)
Dandenong Examiner	Dandenong	No	defunct	1998–2004	Later known as the Dandenong Examiner Independent
Dandenong Examiner Independent	Hastings	No	defunct	2004	Later known as the Dandenong Independent
Dandenong Express	Dandenong	No	defunct	1891–1894	Later known as the Dandenong and Ferntree Gully Express
Dandenong and Ferntree Gully Express	Dandenong	No	defunct	1894–1896	Previously known as the Dandenong Express
Dandenong Independent	Hastings	No	defunct	2004–2006	Absorbed by the Journal (Dandenong)
Dandenong Journal	Dandenong	No	defunct	1927–1972	Later known as the Journal (Dandenong)
Dandenong Journal	Dandenong	No	defunct	2012–2017	Later known as the Dandenong Star Journal
Dandenong Leader	Dandenong	No	defunct	1994–1995	Merged with the Oakleigh-Springvale Times to form the Oakleigh Springvale Dandenong Times, and the Oakleigh Monash Times
Dandenong Leader	Cheltenham	No	defunct	2006–2015	Merged with the Springvale Dandenong Leader to form the Greater Dandenong Leader
Dandenong Observer News Pictorial	Dandenong	No	defunct	1967	
Dandenong Ranges News	Belgrave	No	defunct	1949	
Dandenong Regional News	Melbourne	Yes	defunct	1974–1981	Later known as the Journal (Dandenong)
Dandenong Standard	Dandenong	No	defunct	1958–1960	Later known as the South Eastern Standard News Pictorial
Dandenong Star Journal	Pakenham	No	current	2017–	Previously known as the Dandenong Journal
Dandenong Sunday Flyer	Rosebud	No	defunct	1991	
Daylesford Advocate	Daylesford	No	defunct	1961–1983	Later known as the Advocate (Daylesford)
Daylesford Advocate	Daylesford	No	defunct	1985–1994	Merged with the Creswick Advertiser to form the Hepburn Shire Advocate
Daylesford Advocate and Hepburn Courier	Daylesford	No	defunct	1859–1860	
Daylesford Advocate and Hepburn, Glenlyon, and Blanket Flat Chronicle	Daylesford	No	defunct	1878–1894	Later known as the Daylesford Advocate, Yandoit, Glenlyon and Eganstown Chronicle
Daylesford Advocate, Yandoit, Glenlyon and Eganstown Chronicle	Daylesford	No	defunct	1894–1960	Later known as the Daylesford Advocate
Daylesford Express and Hepburn Advertiser	Daylesford	No	defunct	1860–1868	Merged with the Daylesford Mercury and Hepburn, Franklin, Yandoit, Deep Creek and Glenlyon Advertiser to form the Daylesford Mercury and Express and Hepburn, Franklin, Yandoit, Deep Creek and Glenlyon Advertiser
Daylesford Herald	Daylesford	No	defunct	1883–1909	
Daylesford Mercury and Express and Hepburn, Franklin, Yandoit, Deep Creek and Glenlyon Advertiser	Daylesford	No	defunct	1868–1880	Absorbed by the Daylesford Advocate and Hepburn, Glenlyon, and Blanket Flat Chronicle
Daylesford Mercury and Hepburn, Franklin, Yandoit, Deep Creek and Glenlyon Advertiser	Daylesford	No	defunct	1864–1868	Merged with the Daylesford Express and Hepburn Advertiser to form the Daylesford Mercury and Express and Hepburn, Franklin, Yandoit, Deep Creek and Glenlyon Advertiser
Delatite Free Press and Mansfield and Doon advocate	Mansfield	No	defunct	1880–1884	Absorbed by the Mansfield Guardian and North-Eastern District Advertiser
Democrat	Melbourne	Yes	defunct	1962–1978	Previously known as the Labor Democrat
Demokratia	Collingwood	No	defunct	1965–1966	
Dengon Net	Melbourne	Yes	current	2010–	
Der Kosmopolit	Melbourne	Yes	defunct	1856	
Deutsche Zeitung	Melbourne	Yes	defunct	1861–1862	Previously known as Australische Monatzeitung
The Dialectic	Fitzroy	No	defunct	1875	
Diamond Valley Advertiser	Eltham	No	defunct	1995	Merged with the Whittlesea Advertiser to become the Diamond Valley - Whittlesea Advertiser
Diamond Valley Leader	Preston	No	defunct	2017–2020	Previously known as the Diamond Valley Leader (Banyule ed) and the Diamond Valley Leader (Nillumbik ed)
Diamond Valley Leader (Banyule ed)	Greensborough	No	defunct	2001–2017	Merges with the Diamond Valley Leader (Nillumbik ed) to form the Diamond Valley Leader
Diamond Valley Leader (Nillumbik ed)	Greensborough	No	defunct	2001–2017	Merges with the Diamond Valley Leader (Banyule ed) to form the Diamond Valley Leader
Diamond Valley Local	Eltham	No	defunct	1953–1956	
Diamond Valley Mirror	East Kew	No	defunct	1958–1966	Absorbed by the Diamond Valley News
Diamond Valley News	Greensborough	No	defunct	1964–2000	Splits to form the Diamond Valley News (Nillumbik ed) and the Diamond Valley News (Banyule ed)
Diamond Valley News (Banyule ed)	Greensborough	No	defunct	2000–2001	Later known as the Diamond Valley Leader (Banyule ed)
Diamond Valley News (Eltham)	Northcote	No	defunct	1978–1979	Local edition of the Diamond Valley News
Diamond Valley News (Nillumbik ed)	Greensborough	No	defunct	2000–2001	Later known as the Diamond Valley Leader (Nillumbik ed)
Diamond Valley Torch	West Preston	No	defunct	1974	
Diamond Valley - Whittlesea Advertiser	Eltham North	No	defunct	1995–1996	Previously known as the Diamond Valley Advertiser, and the Whittlesea Advertiser (merged)
Digger	Melbourne	Yes	defunct	1972–1975	
The Diggers Advocate	Melbourne	Yes	defunct	1853–1854	
Dilettante	Melbourne	Yes	defunct	1976–1977	
Dimboola Banner	Dimboola	No	defunct	1886–1899	Later known as the Dimboola Banner and Wimmera and Mallee Advertiser
Dimboola Banner	Dimboola	No	current	1955–	Previously known as the Dimboola Banner and Wimmera and Mallee Advertiser
Dimboola Banner and Kiata, Lawloit, Mt Elgin and Lillimur Advertiser	Dimboola	No	defunct	1879	Later known as the Dimboola Banner and Kiata, Nhill, Mt Elgin, Tarranginnie, Lawloit and Lillimur Advertiser
Dimboola Banner and Kiata, Nhill, Mt Elgin, Tarranginnie, Lawloit and Lillimur Advertiser	Dimboola	No	defunct	1882–1885	Later known as the Dimboola Banner
Dimboola Banner and Wimmera and Mallee Advertiser	Dimboola	No	defunct	1899–1955	Later known as the Dimboola Banner
Dimboola Chronicle	Dimboola	No	defunct	1921–1929	
Dispatch and North-Eastern Advertiser	Wangaratta	No	defunct	1860–1875	Later known as the Wangaratta Dispatch and North-Eastern Advertiser
D. J. Robertson's Austral Banner and Farmers' Gazette	Melbourne	Yes	defunct	1889	
Docklands Community News	Docklands	No	defunct	2004–2009	Later known as Dockland News
Docklands News	Docklands	No	current	2009–	Previously known as Docklands Community News
Dollars & Sense	St Kilda	No	defunct	1978	Later known as the Dollars & Sense Melbourne Weekender
Dollars & Sense Melbourne Weekender	Melbourne	Yes	defunct	1978	Previously known as Dollars & Sense
Domain Geelong	Southbank	No	defunct	2016–2018	Previously known as the Weekly Review (Greater Geelong)
Domain Review (Ivanhoe and Valley)	Melbourne	Yes	defunct	2018–2021	Previously known as the Weekly Review (Ivanhoe and Valley)
Domain Review (Melbourne Times)	Melbourne	Yes	defunct	2018–2021	Previously known as the Weekly Review (Melbourne Times)
Domain Review (Moonee Valley)	Melbourne	Yes	defunct	2018–2021	Previously known as the Weekly Review (Moonee Valley)
Donald Birchip Times	Donald	No	defunct	1973–1994	Later known as the Buloke Times
Donald Despatch and Farmers' Representative	Donald	No	defunct	1900	Absorbed by the Donald Times
Donald Express and Farmers Advocate	Donald	No	defunct	1881–1894	Absorbed by the Donald Times
Donald Express and Mallee Advertiser	Donald	No	defunct	1894–1897	Absorbed by the Donald Times
Donald Mail	Donald	No	defunct	1912–1919	Absorbed by the Donald Times
Donald Times	Donald	No	defunct	1875–1972	Later merged with the Birchip Guardian to form the Donald Birchip Times
Doncaster and Eastern Suburbs Mirror	Cheltenham	No	defunct	1969–1977	Later known as the Doncaster Mirror
Doncaster - East Yarra News	Northcote	No	defunct	1966–1977	Later known as the Doncaster and Templestowe News
Doncaster Mirror	East Kew	No	defunct	1957–1966	Merged with the Outer Circle Mirror to form the Doncaster and Outer Circle Mirror
Doncaster Mirror	Doncaster	No	defunct	1977–1986	Previously known as the Doncaster and Eastern Suburbs Mirror
Doncaster and Outer Circle Mirror	East Kew	No	defunct	1966–1969	Later known as the Doncaster and Eastern Suburbs Mirror
Doncaster Reporter	Box Hill	No	defunct	1949–1964	
Doncaster and Templestowe News	Blackburn	No	defunct	1977–2001	Later known as the Manningham Leader
Doncaster-Templestowe Post	Ferntree Gully	No	defunct	1994–1995	Later known as the Manningham Post
Dookie and Katamatite Recorder	Dookie	No	defunct	1902–1941	
Dunmunkle Standard	Murtoa	No	defunct	1878–1974	
Dunolly and Betbetshire Express	Dunolly	No	defunct	1864–1870	Later known as the Dunolly and Betbetshire Express and Country of Gladstone Advertiser
Dunolly and Betbetshire Express and Country of Gladstone Advertiser	Dunolly	No	defunct	1870–1949	Later absorbed by the Maryborough Advertiser
Dunolly and Burnt Creek Express	Dunolly	No	defunct	1862–1863	Later known as the Dunolly Tarnagulla and St. Arnaud Express
Dunolly Progress	Dunolly	No	defunct	1895–1906	Later known as the Dunolly Progress and Bealiba Advocate
Dunolly Progress and Bealiba Advocate	Dunolly	No	defunct	1906–1908	Previously known as the Dunolly Progress
Dunolly Tarnagulla and St. Arnaud Express	Dunolly	No	defunct	1863–1864	Later known as the Dunolly and Betbetshire Express
Dutch Courier	Avondale Heights	No	current	1985–	Previously known as Dutch Societies Courier
Dutch Societies Courier	Morwell	No	defunct	1970–1985	Later known as Dutch Courier

== E ==
Newspaper	Town / suburb	Melbourne region	Status	Years of publication	Notes
Eaglehawk Leader and Mandurang Advertiser	Eaglehawk	No	defunct	1880–1883	
East Charlton Tribune and Lower Avoca Representative	Charlton	No	defunct	1876–1926	Later known as the Charlton Tribune and Lower Avoca Representative
East Gippsland Miner	Bulumwal	No	defunct	1898–1899	
East Gippsland News	Bairnsdale	No	defunct	1987–2020	Previously known as the Advertiser, East Gippsland News and Market Guide (Bairnsdale ed)
East Gippsland News (Bairnsdale ed)	Bairnsdale	No	defunct	1969–1981	Pictorial edition of the Bairnsdale Advertiser. Later known as the East Gippsland News and Market Guide (Bairnsdale ed)
East Gippsland News (Omeo ed)	Bairnsdale	No	defunct	1969–1977	Later known as the Omeo News
East Gippsland News (Omeo ed)	Bairnsdale	No	defunct	1987–1997	
East Gippsland News (Orbost ed)	Bairnsdale	No	defunct	1969–1981	Pictorial edition of the Snowy River Mail
East Gippsland News (Snowy River Mail ed)	Orbost	No	defunct	1990–1997	
East Gippsland News and Market Guide (Bairnsdale ed)	Bairnsdale	No	defunct	1981–1982	Later known as the Advertiser, East Gippsland News and Market Guide (Bairnsdale ed)
East Gippsland News and Market Guide (Omeo ed)	Bairnsdale	No	defunct	1981–1982	Later known as the Advertiser, East Gippsland News and Market Guide (Omeo ed)
East Gippsland News and Market Guide (Orbost ed)	Bairnsdale	No	defunct	1981–1984	Pictorial edition of the Snowy River Mail
East Gippsland Review	Bairnsdale	No	defunct	1987	
East Regional View	Traralgon	No	current	2025–	
East Rosanna Times	Rosanna	No	defunct	1952–1955	
East Suburban Mail	Hawthorn	No	defunct	1913	
East Yarra News	Northcote	No	defunct	1962–1966	Later known as the Doncaster - East Yarra News
Eastern Post	Box Hill	No	defunct	1961–1965	Later known as the Eastern Post Gazette
Eastern Post-Gazette	Mitcham	No	defunct	1965–1970	Later known as the Ringwood Gazette
Eastern Standard	Cheltenham	No	defunct	1978–1986	Previously known as the Whitehorse and Eastern Suburbs Standard
Eastern Suburbs Advertiser	Kew	No	defunct	1934–1959	Merged with the Hawthorn Standard and the Kew Advertiser to form the Eastern Suburbs Standard
Eastern Suburbs Gazette	Hawthorn	No	defunct	1899–1909	
Eastern Suburbs Standard	Cheltenham	No	defunct	1959–1964	Merged with the Camberwell News Pictorial to form the Greater Eastern Suburbs Standard
Eastern Suburbs Standard	Cheltenham	No	defunct	1969–1974	Merged with the Whitehorse Standard to form the Whitehorse and Eastern Suburbs Standard
Eastern Times	Box Hill	No	defunct	1953–1965	Merged with the City of Box Hill Gazette to form the Eastern Times Gazette
Eastern Times Gazette	Box Hill	No	defunct	1965–1967	Later known as the Box Hill Gazette
Ebros	South Melbourne	Yes	defunct	1967–1969	
Echo	Geelong	No	defunct	2013–2014	Later known as the Bellarine and Surf Coast Echo
Echo	Melbourne	Yes	defunct	1870	
Echo	Melbourne	Yes	defunct	1876	
Echo (Bellarine ed)	Geelong	No	defunct	1984–2002	Later known as the Bellarine Echo
Echo (Colac-Otway ed)	Geelong	No	defunct	1990–2002	Later known as the Colac Otway Echo
Echo (Otway ed)	Geelong	No	defunct	1984–1990	Later known as the Echo (Colac-Otway ed)
Echo (Surf Coast Shire ed)	Geelong	No	defunct	1990–2002	Later known as the Surf Coast Echo
The Echo	Newstead	No	defunct	1896–1912	Later known as the Newstead Echo
The Echo From the Mountains, and North Gippsland Advertiser : a weekly journal of local news and politics	Omeo	No	defunct	1876–1877	
Echo of Islam	Melbourne	Yes	defunct	1988	
Echuca Daily Times	Echuca	No	defunct	1875–1876	
Echuca and Moama Advertiser and Farmers' Gazette	Echuca	No	defunct	1877–1969	
Echuca Record	Echuca	No	defunct	1886–1890	
The Economist	Melbourne	Yes	defunct	1861–1875	Absorbed by the Weekly Times
Edenhope Chronicle and Harrow and Apsley Advertiser	Edenhope	No	defunct	1903–1908	
Edinenie = Unification	Prahran	No	defunct	1950–1977	
Eldorado News and Mining Record, and Ovens General Advertiser	El Dorado	No	defunct	1869	
El Dorado, Oxley and Tarrawingee Advertiser	El Dorado	No	defunct	1870	
Electric Spark	Yallourn	No	defunct	1926–1928	
Ellēnikos Kosmos	Melbourne	Yes	defunct	1991–1995	
Elliniki Phoni	Melbourne	Yes	defunct	1958	Later known as Ethnos
Elmore Standard	Elmore	No	defunct	1881–1969	Later merged with the Rochester Irrigator to form the Campaspe Valley News
Elsternwick Advertiser	Elsternwick	No	defunct	1948	Merged with the Glenhuntly Advertiser and the Caulfield Advertiser to form the Caulfield-Elsternwick Advertiser
Elsternwick and Caulfield Herald	Elsternwick	No	defunct	1891	
Elsternwick Leader	North Brighton	No	defunct	1888	Later known as the Caulfield and Elsternwick Leader
Elsternwick Leader and Caulfield and Balaclava Guardian	Brighton	No	defunct	1887	Later known as the Elsternwick Leader and District Record
Elsternwick Leader and District Record	Brighton	No	defunct	1887–1888	Later known as the Elsternwick Leader
Elsternwick Leader and East Brighton, South Brighton, Cheltenham, Mentone, Mordialloc, Oakleigh, Sandringham, Balaclava and Caulfield Record	Brighton	No	defunct	1887	Later known as the Elsternwick Leader and Caulfield and Balaclava Guardian
Elsternwick News	Malvern	No	defunct	1914–1916	
Elsternwick Times	Melbourne	Yes	defunct	1919–1921	
Eltham and Whittlesea Shires Advertiser	Whittlesea	No	defunct	1940–1942	Previously known as the Advertiser (Hurstbridge)
Eltham and Whittlesea Shires Advertiser and Diamond Creek Valley Advocate	Evelyn	No	defunct	1917–1922	Later known as the Advertiser (Hurstbridge)
Emek	Richmond	No	defunct	1976–1989	
Emerald Hill and Sandridge Post and General Weekly Advertiser	Emerald Hill	No	defunct	1858–1860	
Emerald Hill, Sandridge and St Kilda Times	Prahran	No	defunct	1986–1994	Later known as the Emerald Hill Times
Emerald Hill and Sandridge Times	Prahran	No	defunct	1978–1986	Later known as the Emerald Hill, Sandridge and St Kilda Times
Emerald Hill Times	Prahran	No	defunct	1994–1999	Later known as the Emerald Hill Times including the Melbourne Weekly
Emerald Hill Times	Carlton	No	defunct	2001–2005	Later known as the Emerald Hill Weekly
Emerald Hill Times including the Melbourne Weekly	Melbourne	Yes	defunct	1999–2001	Later known as the Emerald Hill Times
Emerald Hill Weekly	Melbourne	Yes	defunct	2005–2010	Later known as the Melbourne Weekly Emerald Hill-Port Phillip
Emerald Hill Weekly News and South Melbourne Advertiser	Emerald Hill	No	defunct	1857	
Emerald Trader	Avonsleigh	No	defunct	1979–1980	Later known as the Trader (Emerald)
Emigrante	Yarraville	No	defunct	1959–1965	
Endeavour Hills Hallam Doveton Star Journal	Pakenham	No	current	2017–	Previously known as the Journal News
English and Chinese Advertiser	Ballarat	No	defunct	1856–1858	Previously known as the Chinese Advertiser
Enimerosi	Collingwood	No	defunct	1987	
The Ensign	Toora	No	defunct	1947–1964	Later known as the Toora and Welshpool Ensign
The Epoch Times	Melbourne	Yes	current	2003–	
The Epoch Times (Melbourne edition)	Box Hill	No	defunct	2012–2015	
The Epoch Times (Melbourne edition)	Box Hill	No	defunct	2019–2021	
Era	Melbourne	Yes	defunct	1923	
The Esplanade Post : Labor for Australia	St Kilda	No	defunct	1950–1955	
Essendon Echo	Flemington	No	defunct	1908–1909	Absorbed by the West Bourke Times
Essendon and Flemington Chronicle	Melbourne	Yes	defunct	1882; 1884–1894	
Essendon Gazette	Moonee Ponds	No	defunct	1900–1905	Later known as the Essendon Gazette and Keilor, Bulla and Broadmeadows Reporter
Essendon Gazette	Moonee Ponds	No	defunct	1963–1995	Later known as the Moonee Valley Gazette
Essendon Gazette, Flemington Spectator	Moonee Ponds	No	defunct	1962–1963	Later known as the Essendon Gazette
Essendon Gazette and Flemington Spectator, Keilor, Bulla and Broadmeadows Reporter	Moonee Ponds	No	defunct	1925–1962	Later known as the Essendon Gazette, Flemington Spectator
Essendon Gazette and Keilor, Bulla and Broadmeadows Reporter	Moonee Ponds	No	defunct	1890–1900	Later known as the Essendon Gazette
Essendon Gazette and Keilor, Bulla and Broadmeadows Reporter	Moonee Ponds	No	defunct	1905–1925	Essendon Gazette and Flemington Spectator, Keilor, Bulla and Broadmeadows Reporter
The Essendon - Moonee Ponds Northerner	South Melbourne	Yes	defunct	1989–1990	
Ethnic Communities Now	Carlton	No	defunct	1986	
Ethniki salpinx	Melbourne	Yes	defunct	1922–1925	
Ethnos	Brunswick	No	defunct	1959–1964	Previously known as Elliniki Phoni
Euroa Advertiser	Euroa	No	defunct	1884–1957	Absorbed by the Euroa Gazette
Euroa Advertiser and Violet Town, Longwood, Avenel, Strathbogie, Balmattum and Miepoll Gazette	Euroa	No	defunct	1884–1957	Later known as the Euroa Advertiser
Euroa Gazette	Euroa	No	current	1897–	
The Evangelist and Messenger of Christianity, Temperance and Social Purity	Geelong	No	defunct	1892–1893	
Evelyn Observer and Bourke East Record	Kangaroo Ground	No	defunct	1902–1917	Later known as the Eltham and Whittlesea Shires Advertiser and Diamond Creek Valley Advocate
Evelyn Observer and Eltham, Lillydale, Whittlesea, Yan Yean, Kangaroo Ground, Diamond Creek, Anderson's Creek, Yarra Flats, Yering, Caledonia Diggings, Healesville, Fernshaw, Marysville, Greensborough and Templestowe Representative	Kangaroo Ground	No	defunct	1875–1876	
Evelyn Observer and South and East Bourke Record	Kangaroo Ground	No	defunct	1878–1902	Later known as the Evelyn Observer and Bourke East Record
Evening Echo	Ballarat	No	defunct	1895–1929	Later known as The Mail
Evening Mail	Ballarat	No	defunct	1863–1872	Absorbed by the Evening Post
Evening Mail	Melbourne	Yes	defunct	1881–1882	
Evening News	Geelong	No	defunct	1888–1892	Later known as the Geelong Evening News
Evening News	Melbourne	Yes	defunct	1862–1863	
Evening News	Melbourne	Yes	defunct	1895–1896	
Evening Post	Ballarat	No	defunct	1863–1894	
Evening Standard	Melbourne	Yes	defunct	1889–1894	Absorbed by The Herald
Evening Star	Geelong	No	defunct	1870–1909	
Evening Times	Geelong	No	defunct	1871–1875	Later known as the Geelong Times
Evening Tribune	Melbourne	Yes	defunct	1874	Later known as the City News and Evening Tribune
Every Saturday	Melbourne	Yes	defunct	1902–1912	Absorbed by the World's News
Every Week	Bairnsdale	No	defunct	1904–1946	Merged with the Bairnsdale Advertiser and Tambo and Omeo Chronicle to form the Bairnsdale Advertiser and East Gippsland Stock and Station Journal
The Examiner	Dandenong	No	defunct	1990–1998	Later known as the Dandenong Examiner
Examiner and Dalhousie and Bourke Gazette	Kilmore	No	defunct	1867–1868	Merged with the Kilmore Free Press and Counties of Bourke and Dalhousie Advertiser
Examiner and General Advertiser for the Shires of Romsey, Gisborne, Bulla, Springfield and Newham	Romsey	No	defunct	1882–1884	Later known as the Romsey Examiner
Examiner and Kilmore and McIvor Weekly Journal	Kilmore	No	defunct	1856–1867	Later known as the Examiner and Dalhousie and Bourke Gazette
Examiner and Melbourne Weekly News	Melbourne	Yes	defunct	1857–1864	Merged with the Weekly Argus and The Yeoman, and Australian Acclimatiser to form The Australasian
The Express	Bacchus Marsh	No	defunct	1981–1994	Later known as the Bacchus Marsh Express
The Express	Benalla	No	defunct	1994	
The Express	Melbourne	Yes	defunct	1852–1873	
The Express, Bacchus Marsh	Bacchus Marsh	No	defunct	1943–1981	Later known as the Bacchus Marsh Express
Express India	Footscray	No	defunct	2009–2010	
The Express, Melton	Melton	No	defunct	1943–1981	Absorbed by the Bacchus Marsh Express
Extra	Mount Waverley	No	defunct	2011–2018	
Evening Star	Melbourne	Yes	defunct	1867–1868	
Evening Sun	Melbourne	Yes	defunct	1923–1925	Previously known as Midnight Sun

== F ==
Newspaper	Town / suburb	Melbourne region	Status	Years of publication	Notes
Fact	Carlton	No	defunct	1962–1970	Later known as Labor Times
Fairfield and Ivanhoe News and Alphington Advertiser	Heidelberg	No	defunct	1909–1924	Later known as the Ivanhoe and Fairfield News and Alphington Advertiser
Fandango	Box Hill	No	defunct	1986–1993	Previously known as Tell It To The Marines
Farmer	Melbourne	Yes	defunct	1980–1981	Later known as the Victorian Farmer
Farmers' Advocate	Melbourne	Yes	defunct	1917–1924	Later known as the Countryman
Farmers' and Graziers' Gazette	Rosmey	No	defunct	1881–1882	
Farmer's Journal and Gardener's Chronicle	Melbourne	Yes	defunct	1846–1962	Absorbed by the Weekly Age
F. C. Trick's Australian Chronicle, Mining and Commercial Review	Melbourne	Yes	defunct	1889	
Federal Gazette	Melbourne	Yes	defunct	1888–1889	
Federal Standard	Chiltern	No	defunct	1861–1974	Previously known as the Federal Standard and Border Post
Federal Standard and Border Post	Chiltern	No	defunct	1860–1861	Later known as the Federal Standard
Federal Standard and Murray Valley Mining Reporter	Chiltern	No	defunct	1860	Later known as the Federal Standard and Border Post
Ferntree Gully Belgrave Mail	Monbulk	No	defunct	2003–2020	Later known as the Ferntree Gully Belgrave Star Mail
Ferntree Gully Belgrave Star Mail	Healesville	No	current	2020–	Previously known as the Ferntree Gully Belgrave Mail
Fern Tree Gully and District Times	Boronia	No	defunct	1953–1956	Later known as the Croydon, Ringwood and Mountain District Post
Ferntree Gully News	Upper Ferntree Gully	No	defunct	1923–1947	Absorbed by the Mountain District Free Press
Ferntree Gully News and Mountain District Free Press	Belgrave	No	defunct	1953–1956	Later known as the Mountain District Free Press
Ferntree Gully Times	Boronia	No	defunct	1953–1956	Later known as the Croydon, Ringwood and Mountain District Post
Financial News of Australasia	Melbourne	Yes	defunct	1892–1893	Later known as the Financial News and Mining Journal of Australasia
Financial News and Mining Journal of Australasia	Melbourne	Yes	defunct	1893	Previously known as the Financial News of Australasia
Fitzroy City Press	Fitzroy	No	defunct	1881–1920	
Fitzroy and Collingwood Times	Carlton	No	defunct	1937	
Flagstaff Beacon	Warrnambool	No	defunct	1979	
Flash	Prahran	No	defunct	1976–1989	Later known as Prat
Flash	Prahran	No	defunct	1991–1992	Previously known as Prat
Flem-Ken News	Flemington	No	defunct	1992–1994	Later known as the Flemington-Kensington News
Flemington Community News	Flemington	No	defunct	1978	Later known as the Fleming Town News
Flemington and Kensington News	Flemington	No	defunct	1983–1985	Later known as the Flemington Kensington News
Flemington Kensington News	Flemington	No	defunct	1983–1985	Later known as the Flem-Ken News
Flemington-Kensington News	Flemington	No	current	1994–	Previously known as the Flem-Ken News
Flemington Spectator	Moonee Ponds	No	defunct	1889–1924	Absorbed by the Essendon Gazette and Flemington Spectator, Keilor, Bulla and Broadmeadows Reporter
Fleming Town News	Flemington	No	defunct	1978–1983	Merged with the Flemington News to become the Flemington Kensington News
Flier (Frankston ed)	Dandenong	No	defunct	2000–2001	Merged with the Flier (Mornington ed) to form the Frankston and District Journal
Flier (Mornington ed)	Dandenong	No	defunct	2000–2001	Merged with the Flier (Frankston ed) to form the Frankston and District Journal
Flinders Hastings Mornington Independent News	Hastings	No	defunct	1985	Later known as the Peninsula Independent News
Flyer	Mornington	No	defunct	1992–1993	Later known as the Mornington Peninsula Flyer
Foni Ton Pontion	Melbourne	Yes	defunct	1966	
Foothills District Post	Box Hill	No	defunct	1960–1961	Other edition of the Croydon-Ringwood Post
Footscray Advertiser	Footscray	No	defunct	1884–1966	Later known as the Western Suburbs Advertiser
Footscray Advertiser	Footscray	No	defunct	1952–1966	Later known as the Western Suburbs Advertiser
Footscray Advertiser : Williamstown, Braybrook and Wyndham Reporter	Williamstown	No	defunct	1874–1887	Later known as The Advertiser : West Melbourne, Yarraville and Braybrook Reporter
Footscray Altona Mail	Footscray	No	defunct	1994–1995	Later splits to form the Mail (Footscray) and the Altona-Laverton Mail
The Footscray-Altona-Williamstown Westerner	South Melbourne	Yes	defunct	1990	
Footscray Chronicle	Williamstown	No	defunct	1861–1941	
Footscray and District Advertiser	Melbourne	Yes	defunct	1982	
Footscray News	Moonee Ponds	No	defunct	1959–1961	Merged with the Moonee Ascot and Essendon News to form the News (Moonee Ponds)
Footscray Observer and Maidstone, Albion, Braybrook and Flemington Advertiser	Footscray	No	defunct	1859	
Footscray-Western Suburbs Advertiser	Footscray	No	defunct	1968–1982	Later known as the Footscray and District Advertiser
The Forum	Geelong	No	defunct	1998	
Foster Mirror	Foster	No	defunct	1946–1960	Later known as The Mirror (Foster)
Foster Mirror	Foster	No	defunct	1964–1974	Merged with the Toora and Welshpool Ensign to form The Mirror (Foster)
Foster Mirror and South Gippsland Shire Advocate	Foster	No	defunct	1914–1946	Later known as the Foster Mirror
Foster and Toora Mirror and South Gippsland Advocate	Foster	No	defunct	1890–1914	Later known as the Foster Mirror and South Gippsland Shire Advocate
Frankston Advertiser	Cheltenham	No	defunct	1956	
Frankston and District Flier	Mornington	No	defunct	1998–1999	Previously known as the Frankston Flyer
Frankston and District Journal	Dandenong	No	defunct	2001–2003	Later known as the Peninsula Journal Weekender
Frankston Flyer	Rosebud	No	defunct	1990–1998	Splits to form the Frankston and District Flier, and the Longbeach Community Flier
Frankston-Hastings Independent	Frankston	No	defunct	1999–2001	Later known as the Independent (Frankston)
Frankston Independent	Frankston	No	defunct	1991–1999	Merged with the Hastings Independent to form the Frankston-Hastings Independent
Frankston Independent	Hastings	No	defunct	2001–2010	Later known as the Frankston Weekly
Frankston and Longreach Flier	Mornington	No	defunct	1998–2000	Later splits to form the Flier (Frankston ed) and the Flier (Mornington ed)
Frankston News	Cheltenham	No	defunct	1922–1924	
Frankston News	Frankston	No	defunct	1950–1951	
Frankston and Peninsula Independent	Hastings	No	defunct	1988–1991	Later splits to form the Hastings Independent, and the Frankston Independent
Frankston-Peninsula News	Melbourne	Yes	defunct	1968–1991	Previously known as the News (Frankston)
Frankston Post	Mornington	No	defunct	1949–1955	Absorbed by the Peninsula Post
Frankston and Somerville Standard	Frankston	No	defunct	1889–1939	Later known as The Standard (Frankston)
Frankston Standard	Frankston	No	defunct	1981–2001	Later known as the Frankston Standard Leader
Frankston Standard Leader	Frankston	No	defunct	2001–2020	Previously known as the Frankston Standard
Frankston Standard News Pictorial	Cheltenham	No	defunct	1971–1980	Split from the Peninsula Post. Later known as the Frankston Standard
Frankston Standard : Peninsula News-Pictorial	Frankston	No	defunct	1949–1957	Absorbed by the Peninsula Post
The Frankston Times	Tyabb	No	current	2008–	
Frankston Weekly	Mornington	No	defunct	2010–2013	Previously known as the Frankston Independent
Fred Giles' Federal Banner	Melbourne	Yes	defunct	1889	
Freedom	Melbourne	Yes	defunct	1943–1947	Later known as Australia's National News-Weekly
Free-lance	Melbourne	Yes	defunct	1896	
The Free Press	Belgrave	No	defunct	1959–1970	Later known as the Knox and Mountain District Free Press
The Free Press	Belgrave	No	defunct	1989–2001	Later known as the Ranges Leader
The Free Press	Camberwell	No	defunct	1968–1988	Later known as the Camberwell Free Press
The Free Press	Kilmore	No	defunct	1989–2006	Later splits into the Free Press (Kilmore ed) and the Free Press (Romsey Lancefield ed)
Free Press	Camberwell	No	defunct	1983–1988	Previously known as the Camberwell Free Press
Free Press (Kilmore ed)	Kilmore	No	defunct	2006	Later known as the Free Press (Mitchell ed)
Free Press (Macedon Ranges ed)	Kilmore	No	defunct	2007–2012	Later known as the Macedon Ranges Free Press
Free Press (Mitchell ed)	Kilmore	No	defunct	2006–2013	Previously known as the Free Press (Kilmore ed)
Free Press (Romsey)	Kilmore	No	defunct	2015–2021	Previously known as the Macedon Ranges Free Press
Free Press (Romsey Lancefield ed)	Kilmore	No	defunct	2006–2007	Later known as the Free Press (Macedon Ranges ed)
Free Press Leader	Blackburn	No	defunct	2002–2016	Later known as The New Free Press
Független magyarország	Melbourne	Yes	defunct	1965–1968	

== G ==
Newspaper	Town / suburb	Melbourne region	Status	Years of publication	Notes
Gannawarra Times	Kerang	No	current	2015–	Previously known as the Cohuna Farmers' Weekly and the Northern Times (merged)
Gardenvale Southern Cross	Brighton	No	defunct	1924–1928	
The Gazette	Bendigo	No	defunct	1979–1998	Later absorbed by the Bendigo Advertiser
The Gazette	Port Fairy	No	defunct	1967–1983	Later known as the Port Fairy Gazette
The Gazette	Port Fairy	No	defunct	1989–1991	Previously known as the Port Fairy Gazette
Gazette, Berwick	Pakenham	No	defunct	1998	Later known as the Gazette, Berwick-Pakenham
Gazette, Berwick-Pakenham	Pakenham	No	defunct	1998–2012	Later known as the Berwick-Pakenham Gazette
Gazette, Drouin and Buln Buln Shire	Warragul	No	defunct	1992–1994	Later known as the Gazette, Drouin and District
The Gazette, Drouin and District	Warragul	No	defunct	1994	Previously known as the Gazette, Drouin and Buln Buln Shire
Gazette, Pakenham	Pakenham	No	defunct	1998–2012	Later known as the Pakenham Gazette
The Gazette, Warragul	Warragul	No	defunct	1959–1996	Later known as the Gazette, Warragul/Drouin
The Gazette, Warragul/Drouin	Warragul	No	current	1996–	Previously known as the Gazette, Warragul
G'Day India	Doncaster East	No	current	2010–	
Geelong Advertiser	Geelong	No	defunct	1840–1845	Later known as the Geelong Advertiser and Squatters' Advocate
Geelong Advertiser	Geelong	No	defunct	1847–1851	Later known as the Geelong Advertiser and Intelligencer
Geelong Advertiser	Geelong	No	current	1856–	Previously known as the Geelong Advertiser and Intelligencer
Geelong Advertiser and Intelligencer	North Geelong	No	defunct	1851–1856	Later known as the Geelong Advertiser
Geelong Advertiser and Squatters' Advocate	North Geelong	No	defunct	1845–1847	Later known as the Geelong Advertiser
Geelong Chronicle	Geelong	No	defunct	1861–1862	Later known as the Geelong Chronicle, Western District Agricultural and Pastoral Gazette and Vinegrowers Journal
Geelong Chronicle and Steiglitz Guardian	Geelong	No	defunct	1865	Previously known as the Steiglitz Guardian
Geelong Chronicle, Western District Agricultural and Pastoral Gazette and Vinegrowers Journal	Geelong	No	defunct	1862–1865	Later known as the Steiglitz Guardian
Geelong Commercial Advertiser and Looker On	Geelong	No	defunct	1858-1861	Merged with the Geelong Chronicle
Geelong Evening News	Geelong	No	defunct	1892–1897	Previously known as the Evening News
Geelong Independent	Geelong	No	defunct	1986–2015	Later known as the Geelong Indy
Geelong Independent	Geelong West	No	current	2020–	Previously known as the Geelong Indy
Geelong Indy	Geelong	No	defunct	2015–2019	Later known as the Geelong Independent
Geelong News	Geelong	No	defunct	1970–1990	Later splits to form the Geelong News (Northern edition) and the Geelong News (Southern edition)
Geelong News	Geelong	No	defunct	1993–2016	Previously known as the Geelong News (Northern edition) and the Geelong News (Southern edition) (merged)
Geelong News (Grovedale, Belmont and Waurn Ponds ed)	Geelong	No	defunct	2006–2007	Local edition of the Geelong News
Geelong News (Highton, Belmont and Wandana Heights ed)	Geelong	No	defunct	2006–2007	Local edition of the Geelong News
Geelong News (Northern edition)	Geelong	No	defunct	1990–1993	Merged with the Geelong News (Southern edition) to form the Geelong News
Geelong News (Northside)	Geelong	No	defunct	2007–2013	Local edition of the Geelong News
Geelong News (Southern edition)	Geelong	No	defunct	1990–1993	Merged with the Geelong News (Northern edition) to form the Geelong News
Geelong News (Southside)	Geelong	No	defunct	2007–2013	Local edition of the Geelong News
Geelong News (Westside)	Geelong	No	defunct	2007–2013	Local edition of the Geelong News
Geelong Observer	Geelong	No	defunct	1856	Previously known as the Geelong Weekly Observer and Trade Circular
Geelong Register	Geelong	No	defunct	1865–1868	Absorbed by the Geelong Advertiser
Geelong Standard	Geelong	No	defunct	1923–1925	
Geelong Suburban News	Belmont	No	defunct	1968–1970	Merged with the Northern Suburbs News to form the Geelong News
Geelong Times	Geelong	No	defunct	1875–1923	Previously known as the Evening Times
Geelong Times	Newtown	No	defunct	2001–2014	
Geelong Times	Torquay	No	current	2020–	
Geelong Times (Weekly edition)	Geelong	No	defunct	1915–1918	Later known as the Times Weekly
Geelong Weekly Observer and Trade Circular	Geelong	No	defunct	1855–1856	Later known as the Geelong Observer
Geelong and Western District Stock and Station Journal	Geelong	No	defunct	1892–1971	
George Page's Victorian Gazette and Federal Review	Melbourne	Yes	defunct	1889	
Germania	Melbourne	Yes	defunct	1861–1868	
German Times	South Carlton	No	defunct	1981–1985	Later known as Neue Heimat und Welt
Gippsland Chronicle and Crooked River and Stringer's Creek Advertiser	Sale	No	defunct	1866	
Gippsland City Post	Sale	No	defunct	1951–1954	
Gippsland Daily News	Bairnsdale	No	defunct	1890–1891	Later known as the Gippsland News
Gippslander	Sale	No	defunct	1866	Previously known as the Gippslander and Sale Express
The Gippslander	Traralgon	No	defunct	1999	
Gippslander and Mirboo Times	Mirboo North	No	defunct	1892–1964	
Gippslander and Sale Express	Sale	No	defunct	1865–1866	Later known as the Gippslander
Gippsland Farmer	Sale	No	current	1979–	Supplement to the Gippsland Times
Gippsland Farmers' and Glengarry, Toongabbie and Cowwarr Journal	Traralgon	No	defunct	1922–1923	Later known as The Journal (Traralgon)
Gippsland Farmers' Journal	Traralgon	No	defunct	1893–1922	Later known as the Gippsland Farmers' and Glengarry, Toongabbie and Cowwarr Journal
Gippsland Farmers' Journal and Traralgon, Heyfield and Rosedale News	Traralgon	No	defunct	1887–1893	Later known as the Gippsland Farmers' Journal
Gippsland Guardian	Port Albert	No	defunct	1855–1868	Absorbed by the Gippsland Mercury
Gippsland Independent	Drouin	No	defunct	1878–1898	Later known as the Gippsland Independent, Buln Buln, Warragul, Berwick, Poowong and Jeetho Shire Advocate
Gippsland Independent	Drouin	No	defunct	1919	Later known as the Gippsland Independent and Express
Gippsland Independent	Warragul	No	defunct	1922–1932	Later known as the Gippsland Independent and Express
Gippsland Independent	Drouin	No	defunct	1942–1943	Later known as The Independent
Gippsland Independent, Buln Buln, Warragul, Berwick, Poowong and Jeetho Shire Advocate	Drouin	No	defunct	1898–1919	Later known as the Gippsland Independent
Gippsland Independent and Express	Drouin	No	defunct	1919–1922	Later known as the Gippsland Independent
Gippsland Independent and Express	Drouin	No	defunct	1932–1942	Later known as the Gippsland Independent
Gippsland Independent and Express	Buln Buln	No	defunct	1946–1981	Previously known as the Independent (Drouin)
Gippsland Mail	Morwell	No	defunct	1946–1957	Absorbed by the Latrobe Valley Advocate
Gippsland Mercury	Sale	No	defunct	1869–1938	Later absorbed by the Gippsland Times
Gippsland News	Bairnsdale	No	defunct	1891–1895	Later known as the Bairnsdale Courier
Gippsland News	Trafalgar	No	defunct	1937–1964	Later known as the Trafalgar News
Gippsland Standard and Alberton, Foster, Port Albert, Tarraville, Woodside, Woranga and Yarram Representative	Port Albert	No	defunct	1875–1893	Later known as the Gippsland Standard and Alberton Shire Representative
Gippsland Standard and Alberton Shire Representative	Alberton	No	defunct	1893–1971	Later merged with the Yarram News to form the Yarram Standard News
The Gippsland Star : shines in dark places	Port Albert	No	defunct	1973	Previously known as the Yarram Star
Gippsland Stock News and Maffra Shire Cultivator	Maffra	No	defunct	1897–1900	
Gippsland Times	Sale	No	defunct	1861–1981	Later merged with the Maffra Spectator to form the Gippsland Times and Maffra Spectator
Gippsland Times	Sale	No	defunct	1989	Absorbed by the Gippsland Times and Maffra Spectator
Gippsland Times and Maffra Spectator	Sale	No	current	1981–	Previously known as the Gippsland Times, and the Maffra Spectator (merged)
Gippsland Times Weekender	Sale	No	defunct	1980–1984	Friday editions of the Gippsland Times. Later known as the Times Weekender
Gisborne Express, Riddell's Creek and Macedon Advertiser	Gisborne	No	defunct	1860–1861	Later known as the Gisborne Express, Woodend and West Bourke Advertiser
Gisborne Express and West Bourke Advertiser	Gisborne	No	defunct	1858–1860	Later known as the Gisborne Express, Riddell's Creek and Macedon Advertiser
Gisborne Express, Woodend and West Bourke Advertiser	Gisborne	No	defunct	1862	Previously known as the Gisborne Express, Riddell's Creek and Macedon Advertiser
Gisborne Gazette	Gisborne	No	defunct	1892–1965	Later merged with the Romsey Examiner, the Sunbury News, and the Lancefield Mercury and West Bourke Agricultural Record to form the Mount Macedon and Districts Regional News-Gazette
Gisborne Gazette	Sunbury	No	defunct	1978–1979	Merged with the Melton Mirror and the Sunbury News to form the Sunbury Regional News
Gisborne and Macedon Telegraph	Gisborne	No	defunct	1977–1981	Merged with the Woodend Telegraph and the Sunbury Telegraph to form the Macedon Ranges Telegraph
Glengarry, Toongabbie and Cowwarr Journal and Central Gippsland Reporter	Traralgon	No	defunct	1893–1922	
Glenhuntly Advertiser	Elsternwick	No	defunct	1948	Merged with the Caulfield Advertiser and the Elsternwick Advertiser to form the Caulfield-Elsternwick Advertiser
Glenhuntly News	Elwood	No	defunct	1981–1982	
Gold Diggers Advocate and Commercial Advertiser	Melbourne	Yes	defunct	1854	
Golden City Gazette	Bendigo	No	defunct	1976–1979	Later known as The Gazette
Golden Land Education Weekly	Notting Hill	No	defunct	2006–2009	Later known as the Xin jin shan bulletin
Golden Plains Echo	Redan	No	defunct	2004	Later known as the Golden Plains Miner
Golden Plains Miner	Redan	No	defunct	2004–2013	Later known as the Miner News
Golden Plains Times	Ballarat	No	current	2018–	Previously known as the Miner News
Good News	South Melbourne	Yes	defunct	1960	
Gordon, Egerton and Ballan Advertiser	Gordon	No	defunct	1880–1920	
Goroke Mail	Natimuk	No	defunct	1952–1955	Later known as the West Wimmera Mail
Goroke Mail and Kowree Shire Advertiser	Natimuk	No	defunct	1939–1955	Absorbed by the West Wimmera Mail
Go-set : weekly a-go-go	Malvern	No	defunct	1966–1974	
Gossip	Melbourne	Yes	defunct	1890	
Goulburn Advertiser and Murchison, Toolamba, Mooroopna and Dargalong Express	Murchison	No	defunct	1874–1901	Later known as the Murchison Advertiser and Toolamba, Mooroopna and Dargalong Express
Goulburn and Murray Farmers' Chronicle	Shepparton	No	defunct	1885–1886	Later known as the Shepparton Advertiser and Moira and Rodney Farmers' Chronicle : an agricultural journal circulating throughout the Goulburn Valley
Goulburn Valley Advocate and Nagambie Chronicle	Nagambie	No	defunct	1874–1882	Absorbed by the Nagambie Times
Goulburn Valley Farmers' Gazette	Shepparton	No	defunct	1891	Absorbed by the Shepparton Advertiser
Goulburn Valley Leader	Shepparton	No	defunct	1979–1986	Later known as the Midland Times-Leader
Goulburn Valley Stock and Property Journal	Shepparton	No	defunct	1910–1963	Later absorbed by the Shepparton News
Goulburn Valley Yeoman	Mooroopna	No	defunct	1883–1890	Later known as the Goulburn Valley Yeoman and Rodney Shire Advertiser
Goulburn Valley Yeoman	Mooroopna	No	defunct	1895–1926	Later known as the Goulburn Valley Yeoman and Rodney Shire Advertiser
Goulburn Valley Yeoman	Mooroopna	No	defunct	1934	Merged with the Mooroopna News to form the Mooroopna News and G. V. Yeoman
Goulburn Valley Yeoman and Rodney Shire Advertiser	Mooroopna	No	defunct	1890–1895	Later known as the Goulburn Valley Yeoman
Goulburn Valley Yeoman and Rodney Shire Advertiser	Mooroopna	No	defunct	1926–1934	Later known as the Goulburn Valley Yeoman
The Grapevine	Birregurra	No	defunct	1956–1958	
Graphic of Australia	Melbourne	Yes	defunct	1916–1933	Later known as the New Graphic of Australia
Great Eastern	Ivanhoe	No	defunct	1962	Later known as the East Yarra News
Great Southern Advocate	Korumburra	No	defunct	1899–1959	
Great Southern Advocate and Poowong, Lang Lang, Nyora, Loch, Jeetho Valley, Cromwell, Whitelaw, Korumburra, Koorooman, Leongatha, Jumbunna, Anderson's Inlet, Grantville, Settlement Point, San Remo, Kilcunda and Tarwin Representative	Cromwell	No	defunct	1889–1899	Later known as the Great Southern Advocate
Great Southern Star	Leongatha	No	defunct	1889–1891	Later known as the Great Southern Star and Koorooman, Korumburra, Mandan, Allambee, Nerrena and Leongatha Representative
Great Southern Star	Leongatha	No	defunct	1909–1934	Later known as the Star (Leongatha)
Great Southern Star	Leongatha	No	defunct	1940–2020	Previously known as the Star (Leongatha)
Great Southern Star and Koorooman, Korumburra, Mandan, Allambee, Nerrena and Leongatha Representative	Leongatha	No	defunct	1891–1902	Later known as the Great Southern Star and Leongatha, Koorooman, Korumburra, Fairbank, Nerrena, Mardan, Meeniyan, Stony Creek, Inverloch, Allambee, Koonwarra, and Mirboo North Representative
Great Southern Star and Leongatha, Koorooman, Korumburra, Fairbank, Nerrena, Mardan, Meeniyan, Stony Creek, Inverloch, Allambee, Koonwarra, and Mirboo North Representative	Leongatha	No	defunct	1902–1909	Later known as the Great Southern Star
Greater Dandenong Leader	Frankston	No	defunct	2015–2020	Previously known as the Dandenong Leader, and the Springvale Dandenong Leader (merged)
Greater Dandenong Weekly	Dandenong	No	defunct	2010–2012	Later known as the Dandenong Journal
Greater Eastern Suburbs Standard	Cheltenham	No	defunct	1964–1969	Later known as the Eastern Suburbs Standard
Greek Advertiser	Brunswick	No	defunct	1979–1980	
Grenville Advocate	Warrnambool	No	defunct	1862–1874	
Grenville Advocate : and Smythesdale, Brown's, Italian's, Carngham, Linton, and Woady Yaloak Reporter	Smythesdale	No	defunct	1862–1890	
Grenville Standard	Linton	No	defunct	1895–1941	
Grenville Times and Mining Journal	Smythesdale	No	defunct	1872–1875	Later known as the Grenville Times and Smythesdale Advertiser
Grenville Times and Smythesdale Advertiser	Smythesdale	No	defunct	1875–1876	Previously known as the Grenville Times and Mining Journal
The Greyhound	Melbourne	Yes	defunct	1939	
Greyhound Weekly	Melbourne	Yes	defunct	1927–1931	
Gtown	Geelong	No	defunct	2015	
Guardian	Birchip	No	defunct	1948–1972	Merged with the Donald Times to become the Donald Birchip Times
Guardian	Melbourne	Yes	defunct	1939–1966	Later known as the Tribune (Sydney)
The Guardian	Kyneton	No	defunct	1995–2001	Previously known as the Kyneton Guardian
The Guardian	Swan Hill	No	current	1971–	Previously known as the Swan Hill Guardian
Guardian Express	Kyneton	No	defunct	1979–1984	Later known as the Midland Express
Guide	Melbourne	Yes	defunct	1933–1966	Later known as the Racing Guide
Gully Shire News	Boronia	No	defunct	1947	
Güneş : müstakìl siyasî gazete	Campbellfield	No	current	1977–	

== H ==
Newspaper	Town / suburb	Melbourne region	Status	Years of publication	Notes
Haddon's Foodmarket News	Ballan	No	defunct	1966	Later known as Ballan Weekly News
Hamilton Bros.' Federal Herald and Family Journal	Melbourne	Yes	defunct	1889	
Hamilton Courier	Hamilton	No	defunct	1859–1860	Later known as the Hamilton Spectator and Grange District Advertiser
Hamilton Spectator	Hamilton	No	defunct	1870–1969	Later known as the Spectator (Hamilton)
Hamilton Spectator and Grange District Advertiser	Hamilton	No	defunct	1860–1870	Later known as the Hamilton Spectator
Hampden Guardian and Western Province Advertiser	Camperdown	No	defunct	1869–1877	Absorbed by the Camperdown Chronicle
Hampton Bugle	Hampton	No	defunct	1983–1985	Later known as the Bugle
Hampton News	Cheltenham	No	defunct	1939–1946	Merged with the Black Rock News and the Sandringham News to form the News (Sandringham)
Hampton Standard	Cheltenham	No	defunct	1955–1959	
Harness Racing Weekly	Melbourne	Yes	defunct	1997–2019	Previously known as National Trotting Weekly
Harrow Mail and Kowree Shire Advertiser	Natimuk	No	defunct	1946–1948	
Harry Davies & Co's Federal Times	Melbourne	Yes	defunct	1889	
Harry Stone's Sporting Budget	Moreland	No	defunct	1922–1923	
Hastings Independent	Hastings	No	defunct	1991–1999	Merged with the Frankston Independent to form the Frankston-Hastings Independent
Hastings Independent	Hastings	No	defunct	2001–2010	Later known as the Western Port Weekly
Hastings Independent News	Hastings	No	defunct	1984–1985	Later known as the Flinders Hastings Mornington Independent News
Hastings Leader	Blackburn	No	defunct	1988–1994	Merged with the Mornington Leader, and the Southern Peninsula Gazette to form the Mornington Hastings Leader
Hastings Leader	Hastings	No	defunct	2001–2013	
Hastings News	Tyabb	No	defunct	2008–2010	Merged with the Somerville News to form the Western Port News
Hastings Sun	Hastings	No	defunct	1977–1988	Merged with the Mornington Leader to form the Mornington-Hastings Leader
The Hastings - Tyabb - Somerville Post	Mornington	No	defunct	1949–1950	
Hastings - Westernport Post	Mornington	No	defunct	1960–1962	Absorbed by the Peninsula Post
Have-a-go news Victoria	Melbourne	Yes	defunct	1995–1997	
Hawk	Melbourne	Yes	defunct	1895	
The Hawklet : sensation, sporting, drama	Melbourne	Yes	defunct	1895–1929	
Hawklet (Special edition)	Melbourne	Yes	defunct	1920–1930	Other edition of the Hawklet
Hawthorn Advertiser	Hawthorn	No	defunct	1888–1895	Later known as the Camberwell and Hawthorn Advertiser
Hawthorn Advertiser	Kew	No	defunct	1930–1931	
Hawthorn and Boroondara Standard	Hawthorn	No	defunct	1895–1897	Absorbed by the Hawthorn Citizen
Hawthorn and Camberwell Citizen	Auburn	No	defunct	1899–1914	Later known as the Hawthorn, Kew, Camberwell Citizen
Hawthorn and Camberwell Citizen	Hawthorn	No	defunct	1920–1924	Later splits to form the Hawthorn Citizen, and the Camberwell Citizen
Hawthorn Citizen	Hawthorn	No	defunct	1891–1899	Later known as the Hawthorn and Camberwell Citizen
Hawthorn Citizen	Glenferrie	No	defunct	1924–1925	Previously known as the Hawthorn and Camberwell Citizen
Hawthorn Community Forum	Hawthorn	No	defunct	1976–1977	
Hawthorn Herald	Hawthorn	No	defunct	1989–1990	
Hawthorn, Kew, Camberwell Citizen	Auburn	No	defunct	1914–1920	Later known as the Hawthorn and Camberwell Citizen
Hawthorn and Kew Express	Hawthorn	No	defunct	1890–1909	Previously known as the Bulleen, Boroondara, Nunawading, Hawthorn and Kew Express
Hawthorn-Kew News-Weekly	Brighton	No	defunct	1953–1957	Previously known as the Hawthorn News-Weekly
Hawthorn News-Weekly	Elsternwick	No	defunct	1953	Later known as the Hawthorn-Kew News-Weekly
Hawthorn Standard	Kew	No	defunct	1932–1959	Merged with the Eastern Suburbs Advertiser and the Kew Advertiser to form the Eastern Suburbs Standard
Healesville Guardian	Healesville	No	defunct	1893–1898	Later known as the Healesville Guardian and Yarra Glen Advocate
Healesville Guardian	Lilydale	No	defunct	1942–1964	Later merged with the Healesville News to form the Healesville Review
Healesville Guardian and Yarra Glen Advocate	Healesville	No	defunct	1898	Later known as the Healesville Guardian and Yarra Glen Guardian
Healesville Guardian and Yarra Glen Guardian	Healesville	No	defunct	1898–1900	Later known as the Healesville and Yarra Glen Guardian
Healesville Marysville - Yarra Glen News	Healesville	No	defunct	1962–1964	Merged with the Healesville Guardian and the Healesville News to form the Healesville Review
Healesville News	Healesville	No	defunct	1960–1964	Merged with the Healesville Guardian and the Healesville Marysville - Yarra Glen News to form the Healesville Review
Healesville Review	Lilydale	No	defunct	1964–1966	Merged with the Warburton Mail to form the Yarra Valley News
Healesville and Yarra Glen Guardian	Healesville	No	defunct	1900–1942	Later known as the Healesville Guardian
Healesville and Yarra Glen Standard	Healesville	No	defunct	1909–1911	Absorbed by the Healesville and Yarra Glen Guardian
Health and Medicine Today (Jian kang bao)	Melbourne	Yes	defunct	2006–2009	Previously known as Health and Medicine Today (Yi yao jian kang bao)
Health and Medicine Today (Jian kang yi yao bao)	Melbourne	Yes	defunct	2005	Later known as Health and Medicine Today (Yi yao jian kang bao)
Health and Medicine Today (Yi yao jian kang bao)	Melbourne	Yes	defunct	2005	Later known as Health and Medicine Today (Jian kang bao)
Heartbalm	Melbourne	Yes	defunct	2000	Later known as Sports Heartbalm
The Heart of Doncaster and Templestowe	Windsor	No	defunct	1987–1988	
Heart of Forest Hill	Windsor	No	defunct	1988	
The Heart of Waverley	Windsor	No	defunct	1987–1988	
Heathcote Advertiser and Rodney Independent	Heathcote	No	defunct	1872	
Hepburn Shire Advocate	Daylesford	No	defunct	1995–2003	Later known as the Advocate (Daylesford)
Heidelberg and Diamond Valley Weekly	Briar Hill	No	defunct	2007–2010	Later known as the Banyule and Nillumbik Weekly
Heidelberger	Blackburn	No	defunct	1958–2001	Later known as the Heidelberg Leader
Heidelberg Leader	Blackburn	No	defunct	2001–2020	Previously known as the Heidelberger
Heidelberg Mirror	Northcote	No	defunct	1953–1961	Later known as the Heidelberger
Heidelberg News and Diamond Creek Chronicle	Ivanhoe	No	defunct	1930–1934	Later known as the Heidelberg News and Greensborough and Diamond Creek Chronicle
Heidelberg News and Greensborough and Diamond Creek Chronicle	Fitzroy	No	defunct	1897–1916	Later known as the Heidelberg News and Greensborough, Eltham and Diamond Creek Chronicle
Heidelberg News and Greensborough and Diamond Creek Chronicle	Ivanhoe	No	defunct	1934	Later known as the News (Ivanhoe)
Heidelberg News and Greensborough, Eltham and Diamond Creek Chronicle	Ivanhoe	No	defunct	1916–1930	Later known as the Heidelberg News and Diamond Creek Chronicle
Heidelberg and Valley Weekly	Briar Hill	No	defunct	2006–2007	Later known as the Heidelberg and Diamond Valley Weekly
Heidelberg Voice	Eltham	No	defunct	1979	
Heidelberg Weekly	Fitzroy	No	defunct	2005–2006	Merged with the Valley Weekly to form the Heidelberg and Valley Weekly
Hellada	Melbourne	Yes	defunct	1973–1975	Later known as Nea Hallada
The Hellenic Vibe	Northcote	No	defunct	1998	Later known as Vibe National
Hepburn Shire Advocate	Daylesford	No	defunct	1995–2003	Later known as the Advocate (Daylesford)
The Herald	Melbourne	Yes	defunct	1855–1990	Later merged with the Sun News-Pictorial to form the Herald Sun News-Pictorial
Herald Sun (City edition)	Melbourne	Yes	current	2004–	Previously known as the Herald Sun News-Pictorial (City edition)
Herald Sun (Country edition)	Melbourne	Yes	current	2004–	Previously known as the Herald Sun News-Pictorial (City edition)
Herald-Sun News-Pictorial (City ed)	Melbourne	Yes	defunct	1990–2004	Later known as the Herald Sun (City ed)
Herald-Sun News-Pictorial (Late Extra ed)	Melbourne	Yes	defunct	1990–1993	Edition of The Herald Sun News-Pictorial
Herald-Sun News-Pictorial (Late Prices ed)	Melbourne	Yes	defunct	1990–1993	Edition of The Herald Sun News-Pictorial
Herald-Sun News-Pictorial (PM edition Late Prices)	Melbourne	Yes	defunct	1993–2000	Previously known as the Herald Sun News-Pictorial (Late Prices ed)
Herald-Sun News-Pictorial (PM edition update)	Melbourne	Yes	defunct	1993–2001	Previously known as the Herald Sun News-Pictorial (Late Extra ed)
Herald Sun Sunday	Melbourne	Yes	defunct	1995–2018	Previously known as the Sunday Herald-Sun
Heyfield Herald	Maffra	No	defunct	1910–1956	Absorbed by the Maffra Spectator
Heytesbury Reformer and Cobden and Camperdown Advertiser	Cobden	No	defunct	1897–1918	
Heywood Express	Heywood	No	defunct	1967–1973	Merged with the Portland Express to form the Heywood Express Portland Express
Heywood Express Portland Express	Casterton	No	defunct	1973–1974	Later known as Heywood Portland the Express
Heywood Portland the Express	Heywood	No	defunct	1974–1976	Absorbed by the Western Advertiser
High Country Times	Mansfield	No	defunct	1999–2008	Absorbed by the Mansfield Courier
Highland Times	Trentham	No	defunct	1999–2001	
The Hills Trader	Emerald	No	defunct	1989–1994	Merged with the Yarra Valley Trader to form the Yarra Ranges Trader
Hindmarsh Messenger	Nhill	No	defunct	2005–2010	Later known as the Wimmera Messengers (Hindmarsh ed)
Hlas Domova	Caulfield	No	defunct	1951–1979	Later known as Hlasy
Hobsons Bay Leader	Newport	No	defunct	2007–2016	Previously known as the Hobsons Bay Times
Hobsons Bay Times	West Footscray	No	defunct	1996–2007	Later known as the Hobsons Bay Leader
Hobsons Bay Weekly	Airport West	No	defunct	2010–2013	Merged with the Maribyrnong Weekly and the Hobsons Bay Weekly Williamstown to form the Maribyrnong and Hobsons Bay Weekly
Hobsons Bay Weekly Williamstown	Airport West	No	defunct	2010–2013	Merged with the Maribyrnong Weekly and the Hobsons Bay Weekly to form the Maribyrnong and Hobsons Bay Weekly
Holland Australia Post	St Kilda	No	defunct	1962–1965	
Homeseeker News	Caulfield	No	defunct	1978–1979	
Hopetoun Courier	Hopetoun	No	defunct	1970–1990	Later known as the Hopetoun Courier and Mallee Pioneer
Hopetoun Courier and Mallee Pioneer	Hopetoun	No	defunct	1892–1970	Later known as the Hopetoun Courier
Hopetoun Courier and Mallee Pioneer	Hopetoun	No	current	1990–	Previously known as the Hopetoun Courier
Horsham Times	Horsham	No	defunct	1873–1959	Later merged with the West Wimmera Mail to form the Wimmera Mail-Times
Hrvatska istina = Croatian truth	Moorabbin	No	defunct	1977–1993	
Hrvatska sloboda = Croatian freedom	Glenroy	No	defunct	1985–1990	
Hrvatski list	Footscray	No	defunct	1976–1977	Later known as Hrvatski tjednik
Hrvatski narodni val	Moorabbin	No	defunct	1977–1981	
Hrvatski tjednik	Footscray	No	defunct	1978–1990	Later known as Pokret
Hrvatski vjesnik	Clifton Hill	No	current	1983–	
Hume Leader	Northcote	No	defunct	2001–2018	Previously known as the Hume Observer
Hume Leader (Moreland ed)	Northcote	No	defunct	2003–2007	Later known as the Moreland Leader (Northern ed)
Hume Observer	Glenroy	No	defunct	1995–2001	Later known as the Hume Leader
Hume Weekly	Airport West	No	defunct	2004–2013	Later known as the Northern Weekly
Hume Weekly (Broadmeadows/Tullamarine ed)	Airport West	No	defunct	2004–2008	Edition of the Hume Weekly
Hussy : the liberated woman's newspaper	Hawthorn	No	defunct	1972	
Hydro Courier	Bright	No	defunct	1951–1956	Merged into the Alpine Observer

== I ==
Newspaper	Town / suburb	Melbourne region	Status	Years of publication	Notes
Il Globo	Brunswick	No	current	1959–	
Il Maltija : official organ of the Maltese Community Council of Victoria	Parkville	No	defunct	1990–1998	
Il Messaggero	Fitzroy	No	defunct	1962–1992	
Il Progresso	Montrose	No	defunct	1956–1969	
Illustrated Australian Mail	Melbourne	Yes	defunct	1861–1862	
Illustrated Australian News	Melbourne	Yes	defunct	1876–1889	Later known as the Illustrated Australian News and Musical Times
Illustrated Australian News	Melbourne	Yes	defunct	1890–1896	Previously known as the Illustrated Australian News and Musical Times
Illustrated Australian News and Musical Times	Melbourne	Yes	defunct	1889–1890	Later known as the Illustrated Australian News
Illustrated Australian News For Home Readers	Melbourne	Yes	defunct	1867–1875	Later known as the Illustrated Australian News
Illustrated Melbourne News	Melbourne	Yes	defunct	1858	
Illustrated Melbourne Post	Melbourne	Yes	defunct	1862–1868	Absorbed by the Illustrated Australian News For Home Readers
Impact	Melbourne	Yes	defunct	1967–1968	
The Independent	Benalla	No	defunct	1905–1919	
The Independent	Drouin	No	defunct	1943–1946	Later known as the Gippsland Independent and Express
The Independent	Footscray	No	defunct	1883–1933	
The Independent	Frankston	No	defunct	2001	Splits to form the Hastings Independent, and the Frankston Independent
Independent Mounteasterly	Ferntree Gully	No	defunct	1982–1984	Later known as the Knox Standard
Independent Trader	Hastings	No	defunct	1991	Supplement to the Hastings Independent. Later known as the Western Port Independent
India @ Melbourne	Melbourne	Yes	defunct	2008–2015	
Indian Times	Thornbury	No	defunct	2001–2015	
Indian Voice	East Bentleigh	No	current	1993–	
Indian Weekender	Werribee	No	defunct	2014	
Indigo Advertiser and Ovens and Murray Gazette	Indigo	No	defunct	1858–1859	
Indo Times	Thomastown	No	defunct	2002–2022	
Inglewood Advertiser	Inglewood	No	defunct	1883–1963	Previously known as the Inglewood Advertiser and Berlin Chronicle
Inglewood Advertiser and Berlin Chronicle	Inglewood	No	defunct	1869–1883	Later known as the Inglewood Advertiser
Inglewood Advertiser and Kingower, Sandy Creek, Korong and Dunolly District Gazette	Inglewood	No	defunct	1861–1862	Later known as the Inglewood Advertiser and Kingower, Tarnagulla, Korong and Dunolly Gazette
Inglewood Advertiser and Kingower, Tarnagulla, Korong and Dunolly Gazette	Inglewood	No	defunct	1862	Later known as the Advertiser and Inglewood, Tarnagulla, Korong and Kingower Chronicle
Inglewood Advertiser and Sandy Creek and Dunolly District Gazette	Inglewood	No	defunct	1860–1861	Later known as the Inglewood Advertiser and Kingower, Sandy Creek, Korong and Dunolly District Gazette
Inglewood Advertiser and Sentinel Combined	Inglewood	No	defunct	1866–1869	Later known as the Inglewood Advertiser and Berlin Chronicle
Inglewood Sentinel and Raywood Observer	Inglewood	No	defunct	1864	Later known as the Inglewood Sentinel and Raywood, Tarnagulla and Korongshire Observer
Inglewood Sentinel and Raywood, Tarnagulla and Korongshire Observer	Inglewood	No	defunct	1864–1865	Previously known as the Inglewood Sentinel and Raywood Observer
Inner City Gazette	Elwood	No	defunct	1982	
Inside Melbourne	Abbotsford	No	defunct	1998–2001	
Intelligencer	Geelong	No	defunct	1850–1851	Absorbed by the Geelong Advertiser and Intelligencer
Inter-Church News (Melbourne edition)	Ringwood	No	defunct	1960–1961	Merged with Inter-Church News (Sydney edition) to become Inter-Church News (East Coast edition)
The International Socialist	Flemington	No	defunct	1985–1986	Later known as the Socialist
The Irishman	Melbourne	Yes	defunct	1872–1873	
The Irish Review	Melbourne	Yes	defunct	1933–1956	
Irish World : the state of the nation	Mentone	No	defunct	1971	
Irrigator	Rochester	No	defunct	1960–1969	Merged with the Elmore Standard to form the Campaspe Valley News
İslam'ın sesi	Moreland	No	defunct	1987–1989	
Islamic Source	Brunswick	No	defunct	1987–1988	
Ivanhoe Advocate	Mitcham	No	defunct	1992	
Ivanhoe and Fairfield News and Alphington Advertiser	Ivanhoe	No	defunct	1924–1934	Previously known as the Fairfield and Ivanhoe News and Alphington Advertiser
The Ivanhoe Heidelberg Diamond Valley Northerner	South Melbourne	No	defunct	1988–1990	

== J ==
Newspaper	Town / suburb	Melbourne region	Status	Years of publication	Notes
James Martyn's Australian Times and Farmers Gazette	Melbourne	Yes	defunct	1889	
James R. Wood's Federal Gazette and Advertising Newspaper	Melbourne	Yes	defunct	1889	
James Thompson's Federal Gazette, Commercial and Farmers	Melbourne	Yes	defunct	1889	
Jamieson Chronicle	Jamieson	No	defunct	1868–1869	Later known as the Jamieson and Woodspoint Chronicle and Upper Goulburn Advertiser
Jamieson Federalist	Melbourne	Yes	defunct	1889	
Jamieson and Woodspoint Chronicle and Upper Goulburn Advertiser	Jamieson	No	defunct	1871–1916	Previously known as the Jamieson Chronicle
Jebb and Son's Centennial Times and Farmers' Gazette	Melbourne	Yes	defunct	1889	
Jedinstvo	Balaclava	No	defunct	1972–1973	
Jeparit Ensign and Lake Hindmarsh Pioneer	Melbourne	Yes	defunct	1893–1894	Later known as the Jeparit Leader and Lorquon and Hindmarsh Chronicle
Jeparit Leader	Jeparit	No	defunct	1974–1988	Previously known as the Jeparit Leader and Lorquon and Hindmarsh Chronicle and Rainbow Star
Jeparit Leader and Lorquon and Hindmarsh Chronicle	Jeparit	No	defunct	1893–1904	Later known as the Jeparit Leader and Rainbow Star
Jeparit Leader and Lorquon and Hindmarsh Chronicle and Rainbow Star	Jeparit	No	defunct	1913–1974	Later known as the Jeparit Leader
Jeparit Leader and Rainbow Star	Jeparit	No	defunct	1904–1913	Later known as the Jeparit Leader and Lorquon and Hindmarsh Chronicle and Rainbow Star
Jewish Herald	Melbourne	Yes	defunct	1879–1920	Later known as the Australian Jewish Herald
Jewish Post	Melbourne	Yes	defunct	1946–1966	Later known as the Australian Jewish Post
Jewish Weekly News	Melbourne	Yes	defunct	1933–1935	Later splits into the Australian Jewish Herald and the Australian Jewish News
J. G. Stephenson's Australian Standard and Weekly Gazette	Melbourne	Yes	defunct	1889	
John G. Aikman's Federal times and Farmers' Gazette	Melbourne	Yes	defunct	1889	
John P. Hayman's Centennial Record and Weekly Review	Melbourne	Yes	defunct	1889	
Journal	Dandenong	No	defunct	1972–1994	Merged with the Berwick Weekend Journal to become the Dandenong and District Journal
The Journal	Dandenong	No	defunct	1997–2010	Later known as the Greater Dandenong Weekly
The Journal : Glengarry, Toongabbie and Cowwarr Journal	Traralgon	No	defunct	1923–1962	Later known as the Traralgon Journal and Record
Journal News	Pakenham	No	defunct	2014–2017	Later known as the Endeavour Hills Hallam Doveton Star Journal
The Journal Traralgon	Traralgon	No	defunct	1974–1978	Later known as the Traralgon Journal
The Journalists' Clarion	Melbourne	Yes	defunct	1980	
J. Peterkin's Centennial Herald and Farmers' Review	Melbourne	Yes	defunct	1889	
J. P. Wilson's Australian World and Weekly Review	Melbourne	Yes	defunct	1889	
The Junior Argus	Melbourne	Yes	defunct	1934–1939	Supplement to The Argus
J. W. Harrison's Federal Times and Commercial Review	Melbourne	Yes	defunct	1889	

== K ==
Newspaper	Town / suburb	Melbourne region	Status	Years of publication	Notes
Kadapatha	Werribee	No	defunct	2011–2020	
Kaleno Banner	Kaleno	No	defunct	1899–1900	Later known as the Pitfield Banner and Hollybush Times
Kaniva Leader	Kaniva	No	defunct	1983–1989	Later known as the Kaniva Times
Kaniva and Lillimur Courier and Serviceton Gazette	Kaniva	No	defunct	1888–1890	Absorbed by the Nhill Free Press
Kaniva Times	Kaniva	No	defunct	1939–1982	Later merged with the Nhill Free Press to form the Kaniva Times and Nhill Free Press
Kaniva Times	Kaniva	No	defunct	1989–1996	Kaniva Times local newspaper : Shire of West Wimmera
Kaniva Times	Nhill	No	defunct	2005–2017	Merged with the Nhill Free Press to form the Nhill Free Press and Kaniva Times
Kaniva Times local newspaper : Shire of West Wimmera	Kaniva	No	defunct	1996–1999	Later known as the West Wimmera Messenger
Kaniva Times and Nhill Free Press	Kaniva	No	defunct	1982–1984	Later known as the Nhill Free Press
Kaynak	Brunswick	No	defunct	1982–1988	
Keilor Messenger	Glenroy	No	defunct	1969–1995	Later known as the Brimbank Messenger
The Keilor-Sunshine-St Albans Westerner	South Melbourne	Yes	defunct	1989–1990	
Kennedy Bros.' Australian Pioneer Press	Melbourne	Yes	defunct	1889	
Kensington News	Kensington	No	defunct	1977–1983	Merged with the Fleming Town News to form the Flemington Kensington News
Kerang New Times	Kerang	No	defunct	1901–1971	Later merged with the Pyramid Hill Advertiser to form the Northern Times
Kerang Observer	Kerang	No	defunct	1890–1928	Later absorbed by the Kerang New Times
Kerang Observer and North-Western Advocate	Kerang	No	defunct	1885–1890	Later known as the Kerang Observer
Kerang Times	Kerang	No	defunct	1889–1901	Later known as the Kerang New Times
Kerang Times and Swan Hill Gazette	Kerang	No	defunct	1877–1889	Later known as the Kerang Times
Kew Advertiser	East Kew	No	defunct	1926–1959	Merged with the Eastern Suburbs Advertiser and the Hawthorn Standard to form the Eastern Suburbs Standard
Kew Mercury	Kew	No	defunct	1888–1922	Previously known as the Kew Mercury and Hawthorn, Boroondara, Bulleen, and Nunawading Advertiser
Kew Mercury and Hawthorn, Boroondara, Bulleen, and Nunawading Advertiser	Kew	No	defunct	1888	Later known as the Kew Mercury
Kew Sentinel	Glenferrie	No	defunct	1922–1924	
Kiewa Valley Observer	Wangaratta	No	defunct	2005–2013	Previously known as the Alpine Observer (Kiewa Valley and Falls Creek ed)
Kilmore Advertiser	Kilmore	No	defunct	1873–1934	Later absorbed by the Kilmore Free Press
Kilmore Free Press	Kilmore	No	defunct	1868–1989	Later known as the Free Press (Kilmore)
Kilmore Free Press and Bourke and Dalhousie Advertiser	Kilmore	No	defunct	1865	Kilmore Free Press and Counties of Bourke and Dalhousie Advertiser
Kilmore Free Press and Counties of Bourke and Dalhousie Advertiser	Kilmore	No	defunct	1865–1868	Merged with the Examiner and Dalhousie and Bourke Gazette to form the Kilmore Free Press
Kilmore Standard of Freedom	Kilmore	No	defunct	1855–1875	Later absorbed by the Kilmore Advertiser
Kinglake Chronicle	Kinglake	No	defunct	1988–1990	Absorbed by the Yea Chronicle
Kinglake Chronicle	Yea	No	defunct	2013–2014	
Knox Gazette	Mitcham	No	defunct	1969–1971	Later known as the Knox-Sherbrooke Gazette
Knox Gazette	Ringwood	No	defunct	1974–1975	Later known as the Knox Sherbrooke News
Knox Journal	Wantirna South	No	defunct	1999–2010	Later known as the Knox Weekly
Knox Leader	Boronia	No	defunct	2001–2020	Previously known as Knox News
Knox and Mountain District Free Press	Belgrave	No	defunct	1970–1980	Later known as the Mountain District Free Press
Knox News	Boronia	No	defunct	1967–1968	Later known as Knox Sherbrooke News
Knox News	Boronia	No	defunct	1980	Published between issues of Knox Sherbrooke News
Knox News	Boronia	No	defunct	1989–2001	Later known as Knox Leader
Knox Post	Ferntree Gully	No	defunct	1995–1999	Later known as the Knox Journal
Knox-Sherbrooke Gazette	Mitcham	No	defunct	1971–1974	Later known as the Knox Gazette
Knox Sherbrooke News	Boronia	No	defunct	1969–1989	Later known as Knox News
Knox-Sherbrooke Post	Ferntree Gully	No	defunct	1989–1995	Later known as the Knox Post
Knox Standard	Cheltenham	No	defunct	1984–1988	Previously known as the Independent Mounteasterly
Knox Weekly	Bayswater	No	defunct	2010–2013	Previously known as the Knox Journal
Koondrook & Barham Bridge, and Cohuna Advocate	Koondrook	No	defunct	1909–1930	Later known as the Bridge
Kooweerup Sun	Koo Wee Rup	No	defunct	1932–1972	Later known as the Sun (Koo Wee Rup)
Kooweerup Sun, Lang Lang Guardian and Cranbourne Shire Record	Koo Wee Rup	No	defunct	1918–1932	Later known as the Kooweerup Sun
Korean Today	Melbourne	Yes	defunct	2010–2017	Previously known as the Sunday News Melbourne
Koroit Herald	Koroit	No	defunct	1878–1879	Later known as the Koroit Herald and Tower Hill District Advertiser
Koroit Herald	Koroit	No	defunct	1885–1886	Previously known as the Koroit Herald and Tower Hill District Advertiser
Koroit Herald and Tower Hill District Advertiser	Koroit	No	defunct	1879–1885	Later known as the Koroit Herald
Koroit Sentinel	Koroit	No	defunct	1986–1989	Supplement to the Port Fairy Gazette
Koroit Sentinel and Tower Hill Advocate	Koroit	No	defunct	1888–1980	
Koroit Times	Koroit	No	defunct	2001–2006	Absorbed by the Moyne Gazette
Korong Vale Lance and North West Advertiser	Korong Vale	No	defunct	1914–1915	
Korumburra Free Press	Korumburra	No	defunct	1895	Later known as the Korumburra Free Press and Jumbunna and Outtrim Chronicle
Korumburra Free Press and Jumbunna and Outtrim Chronicle	Korumburra	No	defunct	1895–1896	Previously known as the Korumburra Free Press
Korumburra Independent	Korumburra	No	defunct	1892–1911	Absorbed by the Great Southern Advocate
Korumburra Times	Korumburra	No	defunct	1947–1956	Later known as the Times (Korumburra)
Korumburra Times and Victorian Coal Fields' Gazette	Korumburra	No	defunct	1892–1947	Later known as the Korumburra Times
Kowree Advocate	Edenhope	No	defunct	1930–1995	Later known as the West Wimmera Advocate
Kowree Advocate	Edenhope	No	defunct	2022–2023	Previously known as the West Wimmera Advocate
Kowree Ensign and Harrow Advertiser	Harrow	No	defunct	1882–1914	Absorbed by the Coleraine Albion and Western Advertiser
K2 Magazine	Collingwood	No	defunct	1991–1992	
Kumbada Sherbrooke	Upwey	No	defunct	1988–1994	
Kyabram Free Press	Kyabram	No	defunct	1892–1894	Later known as the Kyabram Free Press and Rodney and Deakin Shire Advocate
Kyabram Free Press	Kyabram	No	current	1958–	Previously known as the Kyabram Free Press and Rodney and Deakin Shire Advocate
Kyabram Free Press and Rodney and Deakin Shire Advocate	Kyabram	No	defunct	1894–1958	Later known as the Kyabram Free Press
Kyabram Guardian	Tatura	No	defunct	1879–1938	
Kyabram Union	Kyabram	No	defunct	1886–1894	Later known as the Kyabram Union and Rodney Shire Advocate
Kyabram Union and Rodney Shire Advocate	Tatura	No	defunct	1894–1895	Absorbed by the Kyabram Guardian
Kyneton Chronicle and Dalhousie Agricultural Gazette	Kyneton	No	defunct	1858–1859	
Kyneton Chronicle and Kyneton, Malmsbury and Woodend Advertiser	Kyneton	No	defunct	1874–1885	
Kyneton Guardian	Kyneton	No	defunct	1870–1995	Later splits to form the Guardian Express and the Guardian (Kyneton)
Kyneton Guardian and Woodend and Malmsbury Chronicle	Kyneton	No	defunct	1862–1870	Later known as the Kyneton Guardian
Kyneton Observer	Kyneton	No	defunct	1856–1858	Later known as the Observer (Kyneton)
Kyneton Observer	Kyneton	No	defunct	1861–1925	Later absorbed by the Kyneton Guardian
Kyneton Telegraph	Gisborne	No	defunct	1979–1989	Later known as the Telegraph (Kyneton)

== L ==
Newspaper	Town / suburb	Melbourne region	Status	Years of publication	Notes
Labor	Melbourne	Yes	defunct	1953–1961	Later known as Fact
Labor	Carlton South	No	defunct	1971–1975	Later known as Labor Star
Labor Call	Melbourne	Yes	defunct	1906–1953	Later known as Labor
Labor Democrat	Richmond	No	defunct	1958–1961	Later known as the Democrat
Labor National Herald	Melbourne	Yes	defunct	1995	Later known as Labor Herald
Labor Star	Fitzroy	No	defunct	1976–1995	
Labor Times	Carlton	No	defunct	1970–1971	Later known as Labor
Lakes Post	Bairnsdale	No	current	2005–	Previously known as the Advertiser, East Gippsland News (Lakes Post ed)
Lancefield Chronicle and Romsey Advocate	Lancefield	No	defunct	1867–1872	Later known as Lancefield Chronicle, Romsey Advocate and Farmers' Journal
Lancefield Chronicle, Romsey Advocate and Farmers' Journal	Lancefield	No	defunct	1872–1880	Previously known as the Lancefield Chronicle and Romsey Advocate
Lancefield Examiner and Romsey Advertiser	Warrnambool	No	defunct	1872–1882	Later known as the Examiner and General Advertiser
Lancefield Mercury and West Bourke Agricultural Record	Lancefield	No	defunct	1874–1965	Later merged with the Romsey Examiner, the Gisborne Gazette, and the Sunbury News to form the Mount Macedon and Districts Regional News-Gazette
Land Owners Gazette	Melbourne	Yes	defunct	1910	
Landsborough Times and Moonambel, Barkly, Navarre, and Crowlands advertiser	Warrnambool	No	defunct	1865–1875	
Lang Lang Guardian	Lang Lang	No	defunct	1902–1918	Later known as the Kooweerup Sun, Lang Lang Guardian and Cranbourne Shire Record
Lanka Times	Hughesville	No	defunct	2010	
Large Print Wimmera Mail-Times	Horsham	No	defunct	1981–1986	Edition of the Wimmera Mail-Times
Latest	Melbourne	Yes	defunct	1925	
Latrobe Valley Advocate	Moe	No	defunct	1955–1962	Later known as the Advocate (Moe)
Latrobe Valley Advocate and Advertiser	Morwell	No	defunct	1967–1969	Later known as the Moe Advocate
Latrobe Valley Express	Morwell	No	current	1965–	
L'avanguardia Libertaria	Melbourne	Yes	defunct	1930–1932	
Lawaluk Courier and Mt. Mercer Observer	Lawaluk	No	defunct	1899–1901	Absorbed by the Meredith Sentinel and Bamganie Goldfields Chronicle
Lawloit Times	Kaniva	No	defunct	1886–1939	Later known as the Kaniva Times
Leader (Nth Fitzroy, North Carlton, Clifton Hill edition)	Northcote	No	defunct	1989–1991	Later known as the Melbourne Leader
The Leader : a weekly journal of news, politics, literature, and art	Melbourne	Yes	defunct	1862–1957	Previously known as the Melbourne Leader
The Leader : the Great Northern	Northcote	No	defunct	1938–1939	Later splits to form the Leader-Budget, and the Preston Post
Leader-Budget	Northcote	No	defunct	1940–1955	Later known as the Northcote Leader-Budget
Leader-Budget (Brunswick edition)	Northcote	No	defunct	1946–1966	Later known as the Brunswick Sentinel
Leigh Road Express and Lethbridge and Inverleigh Guardian	Leigh Road	No	defunct	1899–1902	Later known as the Meredith Sentinel and Bamganie Goldfields Chronicle
Le journal de Melbourne	Melbourne	Yes	defunct	1858	
Leongatha Echo	Leongatha	No	defunct	1934–1951	Absorbed by the Great Southern Star
Leongatha Sun	Leongatha	No	defunct	1901–1929	Absorbed by the Great Southern Star
Liberator	Melbourne	Yes	defunct	1920	
Licensed Victuallers' Advocate and Sportsman's Guide	Melbourne	Yes	defunct	1873–1899	Later known as the Courier and Licensed Victuallers' Advocate
Life	Melbourne	Yes	defunct	1886–1891	Previously known as Australian Tit-Bits
Lillimur and Kaniva Courier and West Lowan Representative	Nhill	No	defunct	1883–1888	Later known as the Kaniva and Lillimur Courier and Serviceton Gazette
Lillydale Express	Blackburn	No	defunct	1991–1993	Merged with the Yarra Valley Express to form the Lilydale and Yarra Valley Express
Lillydale and Monbulk Post	Wandin North	No	defunct	1982–1988	Later known as the Lilydale-Yarra Valley Post
Lillydale Shire Express	Ringwood	No	defunct	1973–1978	Merged with the Yarra Valley News to form the Lillydale and Yarra Valley Express
Lillydale and Yarra Valley Express	Lilydale	No	defunct	1978–1991	Later split to form the Lilydale Express, and the Yarra Valley Express
Lillydale and Yarra Valley Express	Lilydale	No	defunct	1993–2001	Later known as the Lilydale Yarra Valley Leader
Lilydale Express	Ringwood	No	defunct	1914–1973	Later known as the Lillydale Shire Express
Lilydale Express, Healesville, Wandin Yallock, Yarra Flats, Warburton, Warrandyte, Ringwood and Eltham Chronicle	Lilydale	No	defunct	1886–1888	Later known as the Lilydale Express and Healesville, Yarra Flats and Upper Yarra Chronicle
Lilydale Express and Healesville, Yarra Flats and Upper Yarra Chronicle	Lilydale	No	defunct	1888–1894	Later known as the Lilydale Express and Yarra Glen, Wandin Yallock, Upper Yarra, Healesville and Ringwood Chronicle
Lilydale Express and Yarra Glen, Wandin Yallock, Upper Yarra, Healesville and Ringwood Chronicle	Lilydale	No	defunct	1894–1914	Later known as the Lilydale Express
Lilydale Mail, Yarra Glen News, Wandin and Silvan Districts Advertiser	Ringwood	No	defunct	1928–1929	
Lilydale Star Mail	Healesville	No	current	2021–	
Lilydale Yarra Valley Leader	Lilydale	No	defunct	2001–2020	Previously known as the Lilydale and Yarra Valley Express
Lilydale - Yarra Valley Post	Lilydale	No	defunct	1988–1995	Later known as Yarra Ranges Post
Linville's Saturday Night	Melbourne	Yes	defunct	1879–1880	Later known as Saturday Night
Lismore Advertiser	Lismore	No	defunct	1910	Later known as the Lismore, Derrinallum and Cressy Advertiser
Lismore Advertiser	Lismore	No	defunct	1951–1966	Absorbed by the Western Plains Advertiser
Lismore, Derrinallum and Cressy Advertiser	Lismore	No	defunct	1911–1951	Later known as the Lismore Advertiser
Lismore News and Derrinallum and Western plains Advertiser	Lismore	No	defunct	1910	Absorbed by the Lismore, Derrinallum and Cressy Advertiser
Live Wire	Yallourn	No	defunct	1925–1962	Later known as the Yallourn Live Wire
The Living Daylights	West Melbourne	Yes	defunct	1973–1974	Absorbed by the Nation Review
The Local Advertiser	Mitcham	No	defunct	1953–1963	
Local Football	Emerald	No	defunct	1992	
Local Paper	Eltham	No	defunct	2016–2018	
Local Paper (Casey-Cardinia edition)	Research	No	defunct	2021–2022	
Local Paper (Diamond Valley News edition)	Research	No	defunct	2020–2023	
Local Paper (Eastern edition)	Research	No	defunct	2020–2021	Later known as the Local Paper (Manningham edition)
Local Paper (Heidelberger edition)	Research	No	defunct	2020–2023	
Local Paper (Knox-Sherbrooke edition)	Research	No	defunct	2020–2023	
Local Paper (Lilydale and Yarra Valley Express Edition)	Research	No	current	2019–	
Local Paper (Manningham edition)	Research	No	defunct	2021–2023	Previously known as the Local Paper (Eastern edition)
Local Paper (Mitchell Shire edition)	Research	No	defunct	2020–2024	
Local Paper (Northcote Budget edition)	Research	No	defunct	2021–2022	Previously known as the Local Paper (Northern edition)
Local Paper (Northern edition)	Research	No	defunct	2020–2021	Splits to form the Local Paper (Northcote Budget edition), Local Paper (Preston Post-Reservoir Times edition), and Local Paper (Whittlesea Post edition)
Local paper (Peninsula-Frankston-Greater Dandenong edition)	Research	No	defunct	2020–2023	
Local Paper (Preston Post-Reservoir Times edition)	Research	No	defunct	2021–2022	Previously known as the Local Paper (Northern edition)
Local Paper (Regional edition)	Research	No	current	2020–	
Local Paper (Southern Cross weekly edition)	Research	No	current	2020–	
Local Paper (Whittlesea Post edition)	Research	No	defunct	2021–2022	Previously known as the Local Paper (Northern edition)
Loch and Bass Valley Advertiser	Loch	No	defunct	1931–1932	
Loch, Poowong and Bass Valley Express	Loch	No	defunct	1903–1927	Absorbed by the Great Southern Advocate
Loddon Herald	Kangaroo Flat	No	current	2021–	
Loddon Times	Kerang	No	defunct	1996–2020	Previously known as the Boort and Quambatook Standard-Times, and Wedderburn and Inglewood Express (merged)
Loddon Valley Courier and Farmer's Advocate	Tarnagulla	No	defunct	1919–1920	Previously known as the Tarnagulla and Llanelly Courier
Longreach Community Flier	Mornington	No	defunct	1998–1999	Previously known as the Frankston Flyer
The Lorgnette: a Journal of Amusements	Melbourne	Yes	defunct	1876–1898	Previously known as the Theatrical Courier
Louis Roth's Pioneer Press and Universal Review	Melbourne	Yes	defunct	1889	

== M ==
Newspaper	Town / suburb	Melbourne region	Status	Years of publication	Notes
Macedonian Herald	Yarraville	No	defunct	1962–1965	
Macedonian Life	Preston	No	defunct	1974–1975	
Macedon Ranges Free Press	Kilmore	No	defunct	2012–2014	Later known as the Free Press (Romsey)
Macedon Ranges Guardian	Kyneton	No	defunct	2001–2016	Previously known as the Guardian (Kyneton)
Macedon Ranges Leader	Sunbury	No	defunct	2001–2020	Previously known as the Macedon Ranges Regional
Macedon Ranges Regional	Sunbury	No	defunct	1995–2001	Later known as the Macedon Ranges Leader
Macedon Ranges Telegraph	Gisborne	No	defunct	1981–1989	Later known as the Telegraph (Gisborne)
Macedon Ranges Telegraph	Gisborne	No	defunct	1996–2010	Previously known as the Telegraph (Macedon Ranges ed)
Macedon Ranges Weekly	Gisborne	No	defunct	2010–2012	Merged with the Sunbury Weekly to form the Sunbury and Macedon Ranges Weekly
Maffra Spectator	Maffra	No	defunct	1881–1981	Later merged with the Gippsland Times to form the Gippsland Times and Maffra Spectator
Maffra Spectator and Gippsland Times	Stratford	No	defunct	1994–1999	
Magazin bosna	Footscray	No	defunct	1996–2017	
Magic Eye	Melbourne	Yes	defunct	1946	
Magyar élet	Melbourne	Yes	defunct	1957–2018	
Magyar szó	Nunawading	No	defunct	1960–1962	
The Mail	Ballarat	No	defunct	1929–1966	Previously known as the Evening Echo
The Mail	Footscray	No	defunct	1924–1994	Later known as the Footscray Altona Mail
The Mail	Footscray	No	defunct	1995–2010	Later known as the Maribyrnong Weekly
Mail-Express	Melton	No	defunct	1983–1994	
The Mail, Bendigo	Bendigo	No	defunct	1968–1970	
The Mail, Mornington	Hastings	No	defunct	1988–2004	Merged with the Mail, Southern Peninsula to form the Mail, Mornington and Southern Peninsula
The Mail, Mornington and Southern Peninsula	Hastings	No	defunct	2004–2010	Later known as the Peninsula Weekly Mornington
The Mail, Southern Peninsula	Hastings	No	defunct	1989–2004	Merged with the Mail, Mornington to form the Mail, Mornington and Southern Peninsula
Maldon News	Maldon	No	defunct	1892–1918	Merged with the Newstead Echo to form the Newstead and Maldon Echo
Maldon News and Loddon Valley Recorder	Maldon	No	defunct	1934–1935	Absorbed by the Tarrangower Times and Maldon Advertiser
Maldon News and Tarrangower Advertiser	Maldon	No	defunct	1892	Later known as the Maldon News
Maldon Times	Maldon	No	defunct	1951–1971	Merged with the Newstead News to form the Tarrangower Times
Maldon Times	Maldon	No	defunct	1975–1979	Later known as the Tarrangower Times
Mallee Harvester	Ouyen	No	defunct	1921–1957	Later absorbed by the North West Express
Malmsbury and Taradale News-Letter, and Metcalfeshire Gazette	Taradale	No	defunct	1885–1886	Later known as the Metcalfe Shire News and Taradale and Malmsbury Mining Record
Malvern Advertiser	Malvern	No	defunct	1946–1962	Later known as the Times (Prahran)
Malvern and Armadale Express	North Brighton	No	defunct	1888–1902	
Malvern and Armadale Recorder	Malvern	No	defunct	1899	Later known as the Malvern, Caulfield and Armadale Recorder
Malvern Argus	Prahran	No	defunct	1892–1902	Later known as the Prahran Telegraph (Malvern ed)
Malvern, Caulfield and Armadale Recorder	Malvern	No	defunct	1899–1902	Previously known as the Malvern and Armadale Recorder
Malvern and Caulfield Gazette	Malvern East	No	defunct	1934	
Malvern, Caulfield and Oakleigh Dispatch	Melbourne	Yes	defunct	1932	
Malvern-Caulfield Progress	Oakleigh	No	defunct	1988–1993	Splits to form the Malvern-Prahran Leader, and the Caulfield-St Kilda Leader
Malvern and Caulfield Standard	Prahran	No	defunct	1906	Later known as the Malvern Standard
Malvern Courier and Caulfied Mirror	Malvern	No	defunct	1905–1917	
Malvern News	Malvern	No	defunct	1903–1916	
Malvern-Prahran Leader	Armadale	No	defunct	1993–2000	Later known as the Stonnington Leader
Malvern Press	Ashburton	No	defunct	1953–1954	Later known as the Carnegie-East Malvern Progress Press
Malvern Southern Cross	Prahran	No	defunct	1988–1994	Later known as the Southern Cross, Malvern, Armadale
Malvern Spectator	Malvern	No	defunct	1934–1942	
Malvern Standard	Prahran	No	defunct	1906–1931	Previously known as the Malvern and Caulfield Standard
Manningham Leader	Blackburn	No	defunct	2001–2020	Previously known as the Doncaster Templestowe News
Manningham Post	Ferntree Gully	No	defunct	1995	Previously known as the Doncaster-Templestowe Post
Manningham Weekly	Dandenong	No	defunct	2005–2007	Merged with the Whitehorse Weekly to form the Melbourne Weekly Eastern
Mansfield Courier	Mansfield	No	current	1867–	
Mansfield Guardian and North-Eastern District Advertiser	Mansfield	No	defunct	1869–1885	Absorbed by the Mansfield Courier
Mansfield Independent Mining, Agricultural, Pastoral and Commercial Advertiser	Mansfield	No	defunct	1869–1872	Absorbed by the Mansfield Guardian and North-Eastern District Advertiser
Manufacturer, Handcraftsman, Agriculturalist and Vigneron's Gazette	Collingwood	No	defunct	1867	Absorbed by the Collingwood Advertiser and Observer
Maribyrnong and Hobsons Bay Star Weekly	Airport West	No	current	2014–	Previously known as the Star, Footscray, Yarraville, Braybrook, the Star, Williamstown, Altona, Laverton, and the Maribyrnong and Hobsons Bay Weekly (merged)
Maribyrnong and Hobsons Bay Weekly	Airport West	No	defunct	2013–2014	Merged with the Star, Footscray, Yarraville, Braybrook and the Star, Williamstown, Altona, Laverton to form the Maribyrnong and Hobsons Bay Star Weekly
Maribyrnong Leader	Newport	No	defunct	2007–2019	Previously known as the Western Times
Maribyrnong Weekly	Airport West	No	defunct	2010–2013	Later known as the Maribyrnong and Hobsons Bay Weekly
The Maritime Worker: the official organ of the Waterside Workers' Federation of Australia	Melbourne	Yes	defunct	1938–1993	From 1939 published in Sydney
Maroondah Journal	Wantirna South	No	defunct	1999–2010	Later known as the Maroondah Weekly
Maroondah Leader	Northcote	No	defunct	2001–2020	Previously known as the Maroondah Mail
Maroondah Mail	Ringwood	No	defunct	1996–2001	Later known as the Maroondah Leader
Maroondah Post	Ferntree Gully	No	defunct	1995–1999	Later known as the Maroondah Journal
Maroondah Weekly	Bayswater	No	defunct	2010–2013	Merged with the Yarra Ranges Weekly to form the Maroondah and Yarra Ranges Weekly
Maroondah and Yarra Ranges Weekly	Briar Hill	No	defunct	2013	Previously known as the Maroondah Weekly, and the Yarra Ranges Weekly (merged)
Maryborough Advertiser	Maryborough	No	defunct	1929–1949	Later known as the Advertiser (Maryborough)
Maryborough Advertiser	Maryborough	No	defunct	1953–1987	Later known as the Maryborough District Advertiser
Maryborough District Advertiser	Maryborough	No	current	1987–	Previously known as the Maryborough Advertiser
Maryborough and Dunolly Advertiser : and Carisbrook, Amherst, and Avoca General Register	Maryborough	No	defunct	1854–1929	Later known as the Maryborough Advertiser
Maryborough Standard	Maryborough	No	defunct	1854	Absorbed by the Maryborough and Dunolly Advertiser
Massina's Penny Weekly	Melbourne	Yes	defunct	1899–1901	
McIvor News and Goulburn Advertiser	Heathcote	No	defunct	1858–1866	Absorbed by the McIvor Times and Rodney Advertiser
McIvor Times	Heathcote	No	current	1994–	Previously known as the McIvor Times and Rodney Advertiser
McIvor Times and Rodney Advertiser	Heathcote	No	defunct	1863–1994	Later known as the McIvor Times
Meeniyan Record	Leongatha	No	defunct	1888–1967	Later known as the Great Southern Star
The Melbourne Advertiser, Port Phillip, Australia	Melbourne	Yes	defunct	1838	Later known as the Port Phillip Patriot and Melbourne Advertiser
Melbourne Argus	Melbourne	Yes	defunct	1846–1848	Later known as The Argus
Melbourne Asian News	Melbourne	Yes	defunct	1996–2015	
Melbourne Asian Post	Melbourne	Yes	defunct	1995	
Melbourne Bulletin	Melbourne	Yes	defunct	1880–1886	Absorbed by the Melbourne Punch
Melbourne Buy, Swap and Sell	Sunshine	No	defunct	1987	
Melbourne Chinese News	Melbourne	Yes	defunct	1996	
Melbourne Chinese Post	Melbourne	Yes	current	1996–	
Melbourne Chinese Property Weekly	Collingwood	No	defunct	2004–2015	
Melbourne City	South Melbourne	Yes	defunct	1990	
Melbourne City News	South Melbourne	Yes	defunct	1991–1993	Previously known as Toorak Times (Melbourne City edition)
Melbourne City Newspaper : Mcn	Melbourne	Yes	defunct	2010–2011	
Melbourne City Sunday	Toorak	No	defunct	1984–1985	Later known as T.T.'s Melbourne City
Melbourne Courier	Melbourne	Yes	defunct	1845–1846	Previously known as the Melbourne Weekly Courier
Melbourne Daily News	Melbourne	Yes	defunct	1848–1851	Later absorbed by The Argus
Melbourne Daily News and Port Phillip Patriot	Melbourne	Yes	defunct	1848	Later known as the Melbourne Daily News
Melbourne Daily Yellow Pages	Collingwood	No	defunct	2011–2013	Supplement to Melbourne Chinese Property Weekly
Melbourne Evening Mail	Melbourne	Yes	defunct	1858	
Melbourne Express	Melbourne	Yes	defunct	2001	
The Melbourne Extraordinary of the Port Phillip Journals	Melbourne	Yes	defunct	1841	
Melbourne Gazette	Melbourne	Yes	defunct	1982	
Melbourne Herald	Melbourne	Yes	defunct	1855	Later known as The Herald
Melbourne Illustrated News	Melbourne	Yes	defunct	1853	
Melbourne Journal	Melbourne	Yes	defunct	1894–1927	
Melbourne Leader	Carlton	No	defunct	1991–2013	Previously known as the Leader (Nth Fitzroy, North Carlton, Clifton Hill edition)
Melbourne Leader (Yarra ed)	Northcote	No	defunct	2005–2016	Other edition of the Melbourne Leader
The Melbourne Leader: a weekly journal of news, politics and literature	Melbourne	Yes	defunct	1856–1861	Later known as the Leader (Melbourne)
The Melbourne Medley : Political, moral, religious, & anti-state-aid advocate	Melbourne	Yes	defunct	1855–1857	
Melbourne Mirror	Melbourne	Yes	defunct	1888–1889	
Melbourne Morning Herald	Melbourne	Yes	defunct	1853–1855	Later known as the Melbourne Herald
Melbourne Morning Herald and General Daily Advertiser	Melbourne	Yes	defunct	1849–1852	Later known as the Melbourne Morning Herald
Melbourne Observer	Eltham	No	defunct	2002–2016	Previously known as The Phoenix
Melbourne Observer	South Melbourne	Yes	defunct	1971–1973	Later known as the Sunday Observer
Melbourne Pictorial News	Melbourne	Yes	defunct	1855	
Melbourne Pictorial Times	Melbourne	Yes	defunct	1855	
Melbourne Punch	East Melbourne	Yes	defunct	1855–1900	Later known as Punch
Melbourner deutsche Zeitung	Melbourne	Yes	defunct	1859–1860	Later known as Australische Monatzeitung
Melbourne Review	Melbourne	Yes	defunct	2011–2014	
Melbourne Shipping Gazette and Daily Diary	Melbourne	Yes	defunct	1888–1891	
Melbourne Star	Melbourne	Yes	defunct	1978	Merged with the Sydney Star to form the Star (Sydney)
Melbourne's Star Observer	Carlton South	No	defunct	1985–1994	Later known as MSO : Melbourne Star Observer
Melbourne Star Observer : MSO	Fitzroy	No	defunct	1998–2000	Previously known as MSO Weekly
Melbourne Sun	West Melbourne	Yes	defunct	2014–2015	
Melbourne Sunday Press	Melbourne	Yes	defunct	1973–1974	Later known as the Sunday Press
Melbourne Times	Melbourne	Yes	defunct	1842–1843	
Melbourne Times	Melbourne	Yes	defunct	1950–1951	Previously known as the Radio Times
Melbourne Times	Melbourne	Yes	defunct	1968	
Melbourne Times in Brunswick	Carlton	No	defunct	1993	
Melbourne Times : Carlton, Parkville, North Carlton, Princes Hill, Fitzroy and East Melbourne	Fitzroy	No	defunct	1971–2010	Previously known as the Carlton News
Melbourne Times (Central City edition)	Fitzroy	No	defunct	1976–1977	Absorbed by the Melbourne Times
Melbourne Times (Eastern edition)	Fitzroy	No	defunct	1976–1982	Previously known as the Collingwood, Fitzroy, Carlton Courier
Melbourne Times (Northcote edition)	Carlton	No	defunct	1991–1992	Later known as the Northcote Melbourne Times
Melbourne Times (Northern ed)	Fitzroy	No	defunct	2004–2006	
Melbourne Times (Richmond edition)	Carlton	No	defunct	1991–1993	Later known as the Richmond Melbourne Times
Melbourne Times in Northcote	Carlton	No	defunct	1992–1993	Previously known as the Northcote Melbourne Times
Melbourne Times in Richmond	Carlton	No	defunct	1992–1993	Previously known as the Richmond Melbourne Times
Melbourne Times Weekly	Docklands	No	defunct	2010–2013	Later known as the Weekly Review (Melbourne Times)
Melbourne Truth	Melbourne	Yes	defunct	1884	Previously known as the Truth
The Melbourne Weekly	East Melbourne	Yes	defunct	1992–2000	Later known as the Melbourne Weekly magazine
Melbourne Weekly Age	Melbourne	Yes	defunct	1856–1862	Later known as the Weekly Age
Melbourne Weekly with Bayside Southern Cross	Melbourne	Yes	defunct	1999–2000	Previously known as the Bayside Southern Cross
Melbourne Weekly Courier	Melbourne	Yes	defunct	1844–1845	Later known as the Melbourne Courier
Melbourne Weekly Dispatch	Melbourne	Yes	defunct	1851	
Melbourne Weekly Eastern	Briar Hill	No	defunct	2007–2012	Previously known as the Whitehorse Weekly, and the Manningham Weekly (merged)
Melbourne Weekly Emerald Hill-Port Phillip	Docklands	No	defunct	2010	Later known as the Melbourne Weekly Port Phillip
Melbourne Weekly Port Phillip	Docklands	No	defunct	2010–2012	Later known as the Port Phillip Review Local
Melbourne Winners	Melbourne	Yes	defunct	1986–1987	Later known as Melbourne Woman
Melbourne Winners Weekly	Melbourne	Yes	defunct	1984–1986	Later known as Melbourne Winners
Melbourne Woman	Melbourne	Yes	defunct	1987–1988	Previously known as Melbourne Winners
Melton-Bacchus Marsh Express	Melton	No	defunct	1995–1996	Merged with the Telegraph (Bacchus Marsh edition) to form the Bacchus Marsh Express Telegraph
Melton/Bacchus Marsh Independent	Melton	No	defunct	1996–1999	Later absorbed by the Bacchus Marsh Express Telegraph and the Melton Express Telegraph
Melton-Bacchus Marsh Mail	Melton	No	defunct	1979–1983	Later known as the Express (Bacchus Marsh)
Melton and Braybrook Advertiser	Melton	No	defunct	1907–1908	Absorbed by the Bacchus Marsh Express
Melton and District Telegraph	Melton	No	defunct	1984–1985	Later known as the Melton Telegraph
Melton Express	Melton	No	defunct	1905–1943	Later known as The Express, Melton
Melton Express Telegraph	Melton	No	defunct	1996–2010	Later known as the Melton Weekly
Melton Independent	Melton	No	defunct	1995–1996	Later known as the Melton/Bacchus Marsh Independent
Melton Leader	Northcote	No	defunct	1999–2016	
Melton Leader (Eastern ed)	Northcote	No	defunct	1999–2016	
Melton Mail-Express	Melton	No	defunct	1994–1995	Later known as the Mail-Express
Melton Mirror	Sunbury	No	defunct	1978–1979	Merges with the Gisborne Gazette and the Sunbury News to form the Sunbury Regional News
Melton and Moorabool Weekly	Melton	No	defunct	2013-2014	Later merged with Star, Melton to form the Melton and Moorabool Star Weekly
Melton Telegraph	Melton	No	defunct	1985–1989	
Melton Telegraph	Melton	No	defunct	1999	Previously part of the Telegraph (Bacchus Marsh-Melton edition)
Melton Weekly	Melton	No	defunct	2010–2013	Merged with the Moorabool Weekly to form the Melton and Moorabool Weekly
Melvournē	Northcote	No	defunct	1999–2000	
Mentone and Moorabbin Chronicle	Mentone	No	defunct	1890–1895	Later known as the Mornington Standard
Mentone and Mordialloc News	Cheltenham	No	defunct	1911–1926	Later known as the Mordialloc City News
Merbein Irrigationist and Murray Valley Soldiers' Gazette	Merbein	No	defunct	1919–1920	Merged with the Mildura Cultivator and the Mildura Telegraph and Darling and Lower Murray Advocate to form the Sunraysia Daily
Mercury	Glen Waverley	No	defunct	1953–1960	Merged with the Clayton-Springvale-Noble Park Standard to form the Dandenong Standard
The Mercury	Fitzroy	No	defunct	1875–1876	Later known as the Mercury and Weekly Courier
The Mercury and Victoria Standard	Geelong	No	defunct	1852	
Mercury and Weekly Courier	Fitzroy	No	defunct	1878–1903	
Meredith and Bannockburn Guardian	Ballarat	No	defunct	1913–1917	
Meredith Sentinel and Bamganie Goldfields Chronicle	Meredith	No	defunct	1901–1908	Later known as the Meredith Sentinel and Steiglitz Miner
Meredith Sentinel and Steiglitz Miner	Meredith	No	defunct	1908–1912	Previously known as the Meredith Sentinel and Bamganie Goldfields Chronicle
Merino Chronicle	Casterton	No	defunct	1939–1973	Later absorbed by the Western Advertiser
Merino Chronicle and Digby and Tahara Reporter	Casterton	No	defunct	1905–1909	Later known as the Merino Chronicle and the Tahara and Digby Reporter
Merino Chronicle and the Tahara and Digby Reporter	Casterton	No	defunct	1909–1939	Later known as the Merino Chronicle
Metcalfe Shire News	Taradale	No	defunct	1895–1908	Previously known as the Metcalfe Shire News and Taradale and Malmsbury Mining Record
Metcalfe Shire News and Taradale and Malmsbury Mining Record	Taradale	No	defunct	1889–1895	Later known as the Metcalfe Shire News
Metro (RMIT/Museum edition)	Melbourne	Yes	defunct	1990	
Metro News	Collingwood	No	defunct	2000–2001	Previously known as the Metropolitan News
Metro News	St Kilda	No	defunct	2005–2009	Previously known as the Toorak Metropolitan News
Metropolitan News	Collingwood	No	defunct	1999–2000	Later known as the Metro News
Mid Day Times	Melbourne	Yes	defunct	1945–1947	Mid-day edition of the Radio Times
Midland Express	Kyneton	No	current	1984–	Previously known as the Guardian Express
Midland Times	Mooroopna	No	defunct	1972–1982	Absorbed by the Goulburn Valley Leader
Midland Times-Leader	Mooroopna	No	defunct	1986–1989	Previously known as the Goulburn Valley Leader
Midnight Sun	Melbourne	Yes	defunct	1920–1923	Later known as Evening Sun
Midweek Sporting Globe	Melbourne	Yes	defunct	1988––1996	Absorbed by the Sportsman (Sydney)
Mildura Cultivator	Mildura	No	defunct	1888–1920	Later merged with the Mildura Telegraph and Darling and Lower Murray Advocate, and the Merbein Irrigationist and Murray Valley Soldiers' Gazette to form the Sunraysia Daily
Mildura Irrigationist	Mildura	No	defunct	1892–1893	Later known as the Mildura Irrigationist and Murray River Cultural Advocate
Mildura Irrigationist and Murray River Agricultural Times	Mildura	No	defunct	1888	Later known as the Mildura Irrigationist and Murray River Cultural Advocate
Mildura Irrigationist and Murray River Cultural Advocate	Mildura	No	defunct	1891–1892	Later known as the Mildura Irrigationist
Mildura Irrigationist and Murray River Cultural Advocate	Mildura	No	defunct	1895–1896	Absorbed by the Mildura Cultivator
Mildura and Merbein Sun	Mildura	No	defunct	1921	
Mildura Midweek	Mildura	No	defunct	1980–2018	Later known as Sunraysia Life
Mildura Telegraph and Darling and Lower Murray Advocate	Mildura	No	defunct	1913–1920	Merged with the Mildura Cultivator and the Merbein Irrigationist and Murray Valley Soldiers' Gazette to form the Sunraysia Daily
Mildura Weekly	Mildura	No	defunct	2007–2022	
Million	Melbourne	Yes	defunct	1901–1902	Previously known as the Weekly Budget
The Miner News	Redan	No	defunct	2013–2018	Splits to form the Ballarat Times News Group, and the Golden Plains Times
The Miner's Right and Castlemaine Advertiser	Castlemaine	No	defunct	1856–1858	Later known as the Castlemaine Advertiser and County of Talbot Chronicle
The Miner and Weekly Star	Ballarat	No	defunct	1856–1864	Later known as the Miner and Weekly Star and Agriculturalist
The Miner and Weekly Star and Agriculturalist	Ballarat	No	defunct	1872	Previously known as the Miner and Weekly Star
Mining Journal and Nine Mile and Yackandandah Advertiser	Stanley	No	defunct	1857–1858	
Minyip Guardian	Minyip	No	defunct	1962	Previously known as the Minyip Guardian and Sheep Hills Advocate
Minyip Guardian and Sheep Hills Advocate	Minyip	No	defunct	1885–1962	Later known as the Minyip Guardian
Mirboo North Times	Mirboo North	No	current	1964–	
The Mirror	Foster	No	defunct	1960–1964	Later known as the Foster Mirror
The Mirror	Foster	No	defunct	1974–2024	Previously known as the Foster Mirror and Toora and Welshpool Ensign (merged)
Mirror	Geelong	No	defunct	1882–1884	
The Mirror of Gippsland	Sale	No	defunct	1932–1934	
Mirror and Portland Advertising Guide	Portland	No	defunct	1880–1882	Absorbed by the Portland Guardian
Modern Asian	Melbourne	Yes	defunct	2016–2020	
Moe Advocate	Moe	No	defunct	1965–1967	Merged with the Morwell Advertiser, and the Yallourn Live Wire to form the Latrobe Valley Advocate and Advertiser
Moe Advocate	Moe	No	defunct	1969–1972	Absorbed by the Latrobe Valley Express
Moe and Narracan News	Moe	No	defunct	1995–2011	Previously known as the Moe and Narracan News (Moe ed) and the Moe and Narracan News (Narracan ed) (merged)
Moe and Narracan News (Moe ed)	Moe	No	defunct	1994–1995	Merged with the Moe and Narracan News (Narracan ed) to form the Moe and Narracan News
Moe and Narracan News (Narracan ed)	Moe	No	defunct	1994–1995	Merged with the Moe and Narracan News (Moe ed) to form the Moe and Narracan News
Moe and Narracan Shire News (Moe ed)	Morwell	No	defunct	1989–1994	Later known as the Moe and Narracan News (Moe ed)
Moe and Narracan Shire News (Narracan Shire ed)	Morwell	No	defunct	1989–1994	Later known as the Moe and Narracan News (Narracan ed)
Moe News	Warragul	No	defunct	1988	Merged with the Narracan Shire News to form the Moe and Narracan Shire News (Moe ed) and Moe and Narracan Shire News (Narracan Shire ed)
Moe Register and Narracan Shire Advocate	Moe	No	defunct	1888–1889	Later known as the Narracan Shire Advocate
Moe and Thorpdale Times	Trafalgar	No	defunct	1902–1916	
Moira Independent	Moira	No	defunct	1883–1938	Later known as the Tungamah Independent
Monash Journal	Dandenong	No	defunct	1999–2010	Later known as the Monash Weekly
Monash Leader	Blackburn	No	defunct	2015–2020	Previously known as the Oakleigh Monash Leader, and the Waverley Leader (merged)
Monash Post	Ferntree Gully	No	defunct	1995–1999	Previously known as the Waverley Post
Monash Weekly	Bayswater	No	defunct	2010–2013	Previously known as the Monash Journal
Monbulk Post	Monbulk	No	defunct	1980–1982	Later known as the Lilydale and Monbulk Post
Monetary Reformer	Footscray	No	defunct	1932	
Moonee Ascot and Essendon News	Moonee Ponds	No	defunct	1952–1961	Merged with the Footscray News to form the News (Moonee Ponds)
Moonee-Ascot News	Moonee Ponds	No	defunct	1948–1952	Later known as the Moonee Ascot and Essendon News
Moonee Valley Community News	Airport West	No	defunct	2001–2010	Later known as the Moonee Valley Weekly
Moonee Valley Gazette	Glenroy	No	defunct	1995–2001	Later known as the Moonee Valley Leader
Moonee Valley Leader	Northcote	No	defunct	2001–2020	Previously known as the Moonee Valley Gazette
Moonee Valley Weekly	Airport West	No	defunct	2010–2013	Later known as the Weekly Review (Moonee Valley)
Moorabbin and Cheltenham News : and Bentleigh, Ormond, Glen Huntly and Heatherton Advertiser	Cheltenham	No	defunct	1910–1912	Later known as the Moorabbin News
Moorabbin Glen Eira Leader	Cheltenham	No	defunct	2001–2017	Previously known as the Moorabbin Glen Eira Standard
Moorabbin Glen Eira Standard	Cheltenham	No	defunct	1995–2001	Later known as the Moorabbin Glen Eira Leader
Moorabbin-Highett Standard	Cheltenham	No	defunct	1956–1959	Absorbed by the City of Moorabbin News
Moorabbin Kingston Leader	Cheltenham	No	defunct	2003–2017	Later known as the Moorabbin Leader
Moorabbin Leader	Cheltenham	No	defunct	2001–2003	Later known as the Moorabbin Kingston Leader
Moorabbin Leader	Frankston	No	defunct	2018–2020	Previously known as the Moorabbin Kingston Leader
Moorabbin News	Cheltenham	No	defunct	1900–1910	Later known as the Moorabbin and Cheltenham News
Moorabbin News	Cheltenham	No	defunct	1912–1950	Later known as the City of Moorabbin News
Moorabbin News	Cheltenham	No	defunct	1952–1957	Later known as the City of Moorabbin News
Moorabbin Southern Cross	Brighton	No	defunct	1909–1935	
Moorabbin Standard	Cheltenham	No	defunct	1980–2001	Later known as the Moorabbin Leader
Moorabool Express Telegraph	Melton	No	defunct	2007–2010	Later known as the Moorabool Weekly
Moorabool Leader	Melton	No	defunct	2001–2013	Previously known as the Bacchus Marsh Leader
Moorabool News	Ballan	No	current	2007–	Previously known as the Bacchus Marsh News and the Ballan News prior to the papers merging
Moorabool Weekly	Melton	No	defunct	2010–2013	Later merged with the Melton Weekly to form the Melton and Moorabool Weekly
Mooroolbark Post	Mooroolbark	No	defunct	1983	Later known as the Lillydale and Monbulk Post
Mooroopna News	Mooroopna	No	defunct	1931–1934	Merged with the Goulburn Valley Yeoman to form the Mooroopna News and G. V. Yeoman
Mooroopna News and G. V. Yeoman	Mooroopna	No	defunct	1934–1939	Previously known as the Mooroopa News, and the Goulburn Valley Yeoman (merged)
Mooroopna and Toolamba Telegraph : Shepparton, Rushworth and Murchison Advertiser	Toolamba	No	defunct	1877–1883	Later known as the Goulburn Valley Yeoman
Mordialloc Chelsea Leader	Cheltenham	No	defunct	2001–2020	Previously known as the Mordialloc-Chelsea News
Mordialloc-Chelsea News	Cheltenham	No	defunct	1977–2001	Later known as the Mordialloc Chelsea Leader
Mordialloc-Chelsea News Pictorial	Cheltenham	No	defunct	1966–1971	Later known as the Mordialloc-Chelsea Standard News Pictorial
Mordialloc-Chelsea News Pictorial	Cheltenham	No	defunct	1974–1977	Later known as the Mordialloc-Chelsea News
Mordialloc-Chelsea Standard News Pictorial	Cheltenham	No	defunct	1971–1974	Later known as the Mordialloc-Chelsea News Pictorial
Mordialloc Chronicle	Mordialloc	No	defunct	2017–2018	
Mordialloc City News	Cheltenham	No	defunct	1926–1966	Merged with the City of Chelsea News to form the Mordialloc-Chelsea News Pictorial
Moreland Community News	Airport West	No	defunct	2001–2008	Previously known as the Community News (Moreland ed)
Moreland Courier	Northcote	No	defunct	1995–2001	Later known as the Coburg Moreland Leader
Moreland Leader	Northcote	No	defunct	2001–2003	Later known as the Hume Leader (Northern ed)
Moreland Leader	Northcote	No	defunct	2003–2020	Previously known as the Coburg Moreland Leader, and Brunswick Moreland Leader (merged)
Moreland Leader (Northern ed)	Northcote	No	defunct	2007–2016	Absorbed by the Moreland Leader
Moreland Observer	Glenroy	No	defunct	1995–2001	Later known as the Moreland Leader
Moreland Sentinel	Northcote	No	defunct	1995–2001	Later known as the Brunswick Moreland Leader
Morning Post	Melbourne	No	defunct	1925–1927	Absorbed by the Sun News-Pictorial
Mornington County Herald	Cranbourne	No	defunct	1889–1893	Later known as the Cranbourne and County Herald
Mornington and Dromana Standard	Frankston	No	defunct	1908–1911	Later known as the Mornington Standard
Mornington Flyer	Rosebud	No	defunct	1989–1992	Later known as the Flyer (Mornington)
Mornington Flyer	Mornington	No	defunct	1994–1996	Merged with the Peninsula Flier to form the Mornington Peninsula Flier
Mornington Leader	Mornington	No	defunct	1963–1988	Merged with the Hastings Sun to form the Mornington-Hastings Leader
Mornington Leader	Mornington	No	defunct	1988–1994	Later known as the Mornington Peninsula Leader
Mornington-Hastings Leader	Mornington	No	defunct	1988	Later known as the Mornington Leader
Mornington News	Frankston	No	defunct	1951	
Mornington News	Tyabb	No	current	2008–	
Mornington Peninsula Flier	Mornington	No	defunct	1998–2000	Previously known as the Mornington Flyer, and the Peninsula Flier (merged)
Mornington Peninsula Flyer	Mornington	No	defunct	1993–1994	Later known as the Mornington Flyer
Mornington Peninsula Independent	Hastings	No	defunct	1987–1988	Later known as the Frankston and Peninsula Independent
Mornington Peninsula Leader	Mornington	No	defunct	1995–2020	Previously known as the Mornington Leader
Mornington Post	Mornington	No	defunct	1949–1955	Absorbed by the Peninsula Post
Mornington and Regional News	Melbourne	Yes	defunct	1978–1984	
Mornington Standard	Frankston	No	defunct	1911–1939	Previously known as the Mornington and Dromana Standard
Mornington Standard	Mornington	No	defunct	1889–1908	Later known as the Mornington and Dromana Standard
Mortlake Dispatch : and commercial, agricultural, and pastoral advertiser	Mortlake	No	current	1884–	
Morwell Advertiser	Morwell	No	defunct	1888–1967	Later merged with the Moe Advocate and the Yallourn Live Wire to form the Latrobe Valley Advocate and Advertiser
Morwell Advertiser	Morwell	No	defunct	1888–1956	Merged with the Yallourn and Newborough Advertiser to form the Advertiser (Morwell)
Morwell Advertiser	Moe	No	defunct	1965–1967	Merged with the Moe Advocate, and the Yallourn Live Wire to form the Latrobe Valley Advocate and Advertiser
Morwell Advertiser	Morwell	No	defunct	1969–1972	Previously known as the Latrobe Valley Advocate and Advertiser
Morwell Advertiser	Morwell	No	defunct	1996	Morwell edition of the Latrobe Valley Express
Morwell Advertiser and Weekly Chronicle	Morwell	No	defunct	1887–1888	Later known as the Morwell Advertiser
Morwell Advocate and Boolara and Mirboo Chronicle	Morwell	No	defunct	1886	Later known as the Morwell Advertiser and Weekly Chronicle
Morwell Advocate and Narracan, Boolara and Mirboo Chronicle	Morwell	No	defunct	1886	Later known as the Morwell Advertiser and Weekly Chronicle
Morwell and Mirboo Gazette	Morwell	No	defunct	1885–1894	Later known as the Morwell and Yinnar Gazette
Morwell and Yinnar Gazette	Morwell	No	defunct	1894–1916	Absorbed by the Morwell Advertiser
Mount Alexander Mail	Castlemaine	No	defunct	1854–1917	Later known as the Castlemaine Mail
Mount Ararat Advertiser	Ararat	No	defunct	1857	Later known as the Mount Ararat News and Chronicle
Mount Ararat Advertiser and Chronicle for the District of Wimmera	Ararat	No	defunct	1857–1861	Later known as the Ararat and Pleasant Creek Advertiser
Mount Bulla News	Wangaratta	No	current	2013–	
Mount Eliza Flyer	Dromana	No	defunct	1992–1996	
Mount Evelyn Mail	Mount Evelyn	No	defunct	2009–2020	Later known as the Mount Evelyn Star Mail
Mount Evelyn Star Mail	Healesville	No	current	2020–	Previously known as the Mount Evelyn Mail
Mount Hotham Falls Creek News	Wangaratta	No	defunct	2014–2021	
Mount Macedon and Districts Regional News-Gazette	Sunbury	No	defunct	1965–1978	Later splits to form the Melton Mirror, the Gisborne Gazette, and the Sunbury News
Mount William Pioneer	Hamilton	No	defunct	1900	
Mount Wycheproof Ensign	Mount Wycheproof	No	defunct	1881–1890	Later known as the Mount Wycheproof Ensign and East Wimmera Advocate
Mount Wycheproof Ensign and East Wimmera Advocate	Mount Wycheproof	No	defunct	1890–1961	Later merged with the Wycheprooof News to form the New Wycheproof Ensign
Mountain District Free Press	Tecoma	No	defunct	1946–1947	Later known as the Mountain District Free Press and Ferntree Gully News
Mountain District Free Press	Belgrave	No	defunct	1956–1959	Later known as The Free Press
Mountain District Free Press	Belgrave	No	defunct	1980–1989	Later known as the Sherbrooke and District Free Press
Mountain District Free Press and Ferntree Gully News	Upwey	No	defunct	1947–1953	Later known as the Ferntree Gully News and Mountain District Free Press
Mounteasterly	Ferntree Gully	No	defunct	1980–1982	Later known as the Independent Mounteasterly
The Mountaineer	Ferntree Gully	No	defunct	1920–1921	
Mountaineer	Wood's Point	No	defunct	1864–1865	Merged with the Wood's Point Times to become the Wood's Point Times and Mountaineer
Mountain Views	Healesville	No	defunct	1979–1999	Later known as the Mountain Views Mail
Mountain Views Mail	Healesville	No	defunct	1999–2020	Later known as the Mountain Views Star Mail
Mountain Views Star Mail	Healesville	No	current	2020–	Previously known as the Mountain Views Mail
Moyne Gazette	Port Fairy	No	defunct	1994–2019	
MSO : Melbourne Star Observer	Fitzroy	No	defunct	1993–1994	Later known as the MSO Weekly
MSO Weekly	Fitzroy	No	defunct	1995–1998	Later known as Melbourne Star Observer : MSO
Mulgrave Advertiser	North Brighton	No	defunct	1958–1959	Absorbed by the Oakleigh Advertiser
Mulgrave Mercury	Caulfield North	No	defunct	1949–1953	Later known as the Mercury (Glen Waverley)
Mulgrave Times and Shire Advocate	Oakleigh	No	defunct	1896–1897	
Murchison Advertiser	Rushworth	No	defunct	1956–1962	Merged with the Rushworth Chronicle and Waranga Advertiser to form the Rushworth Chronicle
Murchison Advertiser and Murchison, Toolamba, Mooroopna and Dargalong Express	Murchison	No	defunct	1901–1903	Later known as the Murchison Advertiser and Toolamba, Mooroopna and Dargalong Express
Murchison Advertiser and Toolamba, Mooroopna and Dargalong Express	Rushworth	No	defunct	1903–1956	Later known as the Murchison Advertiser
Murray Gazette and Wahgunyah and Corowa Herald	Rutherglen	No	defunct	1861–1866	Absorbed by the Federal Standard
Murrayville Mirror	Ouyen	No	defunct	1920–1927	Later known as the Underbool Mirror
Murtoa Observer and Dunmunkle Gazette	Warrnambool	No	defunct	1895–1896	
Music Week	Melbourne	Yes	defunct	1972–1973	
Myrtleford Mail	Myrtleford	No	defunct	1911	Later known as the Myrtleford Mail and Whorouly Whitness
Myrtleford Mail	Myrtleford	No	defunct	1924–1936	Merged into the Myrtleford Times and Oven Valley Advertiser
Myrtleford Mail and Whorouly Witness	Myrtleford	No	defunct	1911–1924	Later known as the Myrtleford Mail
Myrtleford Times	Myrtleford	No	defunct	1987–1991	
Myrtleford Times	Myrtleford	No	current	1999–	
Myrtleford Times and Ovens Valley Advertiser	Myrtleford	No	defunct	1930–1987	Later known as the Myrtleford Times
Myrtleford Times and Ovens Valley Advertiser	Myrtleford	No	defunct	1991–1994	Merged with the Alpine Observer to form the Alpine Times
MX	Port Melbourne	No	defunct	2001–2015	
MX Myer	Southbank	No	defunct	2024	
MX Rising	Southbank	No	defunct	2024	
MX Zero	Port Melbourne	No	defunct	2018	

== N ==
Newspaper	Town / suburb	Melbourne region	Status	Years of publication	Notes
Nagambie Chronicle	Yea	No	defunct	1990–1992	Previously known as Nagambie Natterings
Nagambie Herald and Avenel, Murchison and Goulburn Valley Advertiser	Nagambie	No	defunct	1873	Previously known as the Nagambie Herald and Goulburn Valley Advertiser
Nagambie Herald and Goulburn Valley Advertiser	Nagambie	No	defunct	1873	Later known as the Nagambie Herald and Avenel, Murchison and Goulburn Valley Advertiser
Nagambie Times	Nagambie	No	defunct	1878–1960	
Narracan Shire Advocate	Moe	No	defunct	1889–1923	Later known as the Narracan Shire Advocate and Yallourn Brown Coal Mine, Walhalla and Thorpdale Lines Echo
Narracan Shire Advocate	Moe	No	defunct	1944–1955	Later known as the Latrobe Valley Advocate
Narracan Shire Advocate and Yallourn Brown Coal Mine, Walhalla and Thorpdale Lines Echo	Moe	No	defunct	1923–1943	Later known as the Narracan Shire Advocate
Narracan Shire News	Morwell	No	defunct	1988	Merged with Moe News to form Moe and Narracan Shire News (Moe ed) and Moe and Narracan Shire News (Narracan Shire ed)
Nathalia Herald	Nathalia	No	defunct	1925–1975	Previously known as the Nathalia Herald and Picola, Narioka, Kotupna and Moira Advertiser
Nathalia Herald and Picola, Narioka, Kotupna and Moira Advertiser	Nathalia	No	defunct	1884–1925	Later known as the Nathalia Herald
Nathalia Leader	Numurkah	No	defunct	1895–1896	
Nation	Melbourne	Yes	defunct	1981	Previously known as the Nation Review
The Nation	Melbourne	Yes	defunct	1917	
The Nation	Melbourne	Yes	defunct	1918–1920	
Nation Review	Melbourne	Yes	defunct	1972–1981	Splits to form the Nation (Melbourne) and the Review (Prahran)
National Greyhound Form	Essendon	No	defunct	1997–2016	
National Greyhound Weekly	Melbourne	Yes	defunct	1993–1998	Previously known as the Victorian Greyhound Weekly
National Trotting Weekly	Melbourne	Yes	defunct	1979–1997	Later known as Harness Racing Weekly
Nea Hallada	Melbourne	Yes	defunct	1975–2010	Absorbed by Neos Kosmos
Nea poreia	Fitzroy	No	defunct	1977–1988	
Neerim News and Gippsland Representative	Warragul	No	defunct	1893–1894	Previously known as the Neerim News and South Gippsland Representative
Neerim News and South Gippsland Representative	Warragul	No	defunct	1891–1893	Later known as the Neerim News and Gippsland Representative
Neos Kosmos	Melbourne	Yes	current	1957–	Previously known as Australo-Ellin
Neos pirsos = The Greek torch	Black Rock	No	defunct	1990–1993	Previously known as Pirsos
Neue Heimat und Welt	Coburg	No	defunct	1985–2005	Previously known as the German Times
Neue Welt	St Kilda	No	defunct	1954–1981	Later known as Neue Welt with German Times
Neue Welt with German Times	Fitzroy	No	defunct	1981	Later known as German Times
New Asian	Melbourne	Yes	defunct	1980	Previously known as the Asian
New Australasian Post	Melbourne	Yes	defunct	1996	Later known as the New Post
The New Austral Times	South Melbourne	Yes	defunct	1982	
New Democracy	Richmond	No	defunct	1985–1986	
New Era	Melbourne	Yes	defunct	1972	
The New Free Press	Eltham	No	defunct	2016–	Previously known as the Free Press Leader
New Generation	Collingwood	No	defunct	1979–1981	
New Graphic of Australia	Melbourne	Yes	defunct	1933–1935	Previously known as the Graphic of Australia
New Guardian	Warragul	No	defunct	1961–1974	Absorbed by the Gazette, Warragul
New Life	Melbourne	Yes	defunct	1939–2010	Previously known as Edifier
New Post	Melbourne	Yes	defunct	1996–1997	Later known as Aussie Post
New Punch	East Melbourne	Yes	defunct	1920–1921	Later known as Punch
Newsagent and Bookseller	Prahran	No	defunct	1972–1975	Previously known as Australian Newsagent
New Times	Melbourne	Yes	defunct	1935–1999	Merged with Intelligence Survey to form the New Times Survey
New Weekender	Richmond	No	defunct	1974	Previously known as the Postscript Weekender
New Wimmera Star	Horsham	No	defunct	1927–1929	Previously known as the Wimmera Star
New Wycheproof Ensign	Charlton	No	defunct	1961–1970	Merged with the Sea Lake Times and Primary Producers' Advocate to form the Sea Lake and Wycheproof Times Ensign
News	Altona	No	defunct	1953–1954	Later known as the Star News
The News	Frankston	No	defunct	1967–1968	Later known as the Frankston-Peninsula News
The News	Ivanhoe	No	defunct	1934–1958	Later known as the Rosanna Diamond Valley News
The News	Moonee Ponds	No	defunct	1961–1973	Merged with the Northern Advertiser to form the Northern Regional News
The News	Sandringham	No	defunct	1946–1971	Later known as the Sandringham and Brighton Advertiser
News, Berwick	Pakenham	No	defunct	1996–2017	Previously known as the Berwick News
News, Cranbourne	Pakenham	No	defunct	1996–2017	Previously known as the Cranbourne News
News, Dandenong	Melbourne	Yes	defunct	1968–1969	Merged with the News, Springvale Clayton to become the News, Dandenong / Springvale / Clayton
News, Dandenong Region	Melbourne	Yes	defunct	1973–1974	Later known as the Dandenong Regional News
News, Dandenong / Springvale / Clayton	Melbourne	Yes	defunct	1969–1973	Later known as the News, Dandenong Region
Newsday	Melbourne	Yes	defunct	1959	
Newsday	Melbourne	Yes	defunct	1969–1970	
News, Pakenham	Pakenham	No	defunct	2003–2014	Later known as the News, Pakenham, Officer
News, Pakenham, Officer	Pakenham	No	defunct	2014–2017	Later known as the Pakenham Officer Star News
The News of Prahran-Windsor-Balaclava-St. Kilda	Elsternwick	No	defunct	1948–1950	Later known as the St Kilda-Prahran News
News, Springvale Clayton	Melbourne	Yes	defunct	1968–1969	Merged with the News, Dandenong to become the News, Dandenong / Springvale / Clayton
News of the Week	Geelong	No	defunct	1856–1858	Other edition of the Geelong Advertiser and Intelligencer. Later known as the News of the Week and Western District Advertiser
News of the Week	Geelong	No	defunct	1905–1924	Previously known as the News of the Week and Western District Advertiser
News of the Week and Western District Advertiser	Geelong	No	defunct	1882–1903	Later known as News of the Week
News Weekly	Melbourne	Yes	current	1965–	Previously known as Australia's National News-Weekly
Newstead Echo	Newstead	No	defunct	1912–1918	Merged with the Maldon News to form the Newstead and Maldon Echo
Newstead and Maldon Echo	Newstead	No	defunct	1918–1968	Previously known as the Maldon News, and the Newstead Echo (merged)
Newstead News	Maldon	No	defunct	1968–1971	Merged with the Maldon News to form the Tarrangower Times
Ngày mai	Richmond	No	defunct	1984–1987	Previously known as Việt Nam ngày mai
Nhan quyen	Richmond	No	current	1984–	
Nhill Community News	Nhill	No	defunct	2007	
Nhill Free Press	Nhill	No	defunct	1882–1982	Later merged with the Kaniva Times to form the Kaniva Times and Nhill Free Press
Nhill Free Press	Nhill	No	defunct	1984–1999	Later known as the Hindmarsh Messenger
Nhill Free Press	Nhill	No	defunct	2010–2017	Merged with the Kaniva Times to form the Nhill Free Press and Kaniva Times
Nhill Free Press and Kaniva Times	Wendouree	No	current	2017–	Previously known as the Nhill Free Press, and the Kaniva Times (merged)
Nhill Free Press and Lowan and Lawloit Shires Advertiser	Nhill	No	defunct	1891–1900	Merged with the Nhill Mail to form the Nhill Free Press
Nhill Free Press and Lowanshire Advertiser	Nhill	No	defunct	1882–1891	Later known as the Nhill Free Press and Lowan and Lawloit Shires Advertiser
Nhill Gazette	Nhill	No	defunct	1977	Absorbed by the Nhill Free Press
Nhill Mail	Nhill	No	defunct	1895–1900	Merged with the Nhill Free Press and Lowan and Lawloit Shires Advertiser to form the Nhill Free Press
Nhill and Tatiara Mail and West Wimmera Advertiser	Nhill	No	defunct	1888–1895	Later known as the Nhill Mail
Nichigo Press (Victoria ed)	Melbourne	Yes	current	2005–	
Nillumbik Mail	Eltham	No	defunct	2000–2001	
Norden	Melbourne	Yes	defunct	1896–1940	
North Central News	St Arnaud	No	current	1981–	Previously known as the St Arnaud Mercury, and the Charlton Tribune (merged)
North Central Review	Kilmore	No	current	2004–	
Northcote Leader	Northcote	No	defunct	1888–1938	Later merges with the Preston Leader to form the Leader (Northcote)
Northcote Leader	Northcote	No	defunct	1966–2020	Previously known as the Northcote Leader-Budget
Northcote Leader-Budget	Northcote	No	defunct	1955–1966	Later known as the Northcote Leader
Northcote Leader and District Record	Brighton	No	defunct	1888	Later known as the Northcote Leader and Preston Record
Northcote Leader and Preston Record	Northcote	No	defunct	1888	Later known as the Northcote and Preston Leader and Suburban Advertiser
Northcote Melbourne Times	Carlton	No	defunct	1992	Later known as the Melbourne Times in Northcote
Northcote and Preston Leader	Northcote	No	defunct	1888	Later splits to form the Northcote Leader, and the Preston Leader
Northcote and Preston Leader and Suburban Advertiser	Northcote	No	defunct	1888	Later known as the Northcote and Preston Leader
Northcote and Preston Times	Northcote	No	defunct	1904–1905	
North East Advertiser	Wangaratta	No	defunct	1995–1997	Previously known as the Wangaratta and North East Advertiser
Northeast Ensign	Benalla	No	defunct	1979–1986	Later merged with the Benalla Ensign to form the Benalla and Northeast Ensign
North Eastern Despatch	Wangaratta	No	defunct	1907–1920	Later known as the Wangaratta Despatch
North Eastern Ensign	Benalla	No	defunct	1872–1938	Later known as the Benalla Ensign
North-Eastern News	Wangaratta	No	defunct	1907	Merged with the Wangaratta Dispatch and North-Eastern Advertiser to form the North Eastern Despatch
North East Telegraph	Wangaratta	No	defunct	2001	Previously known as the Weekly Telegraph
North Eastern Telegraph	Wangaratta	No	defunct	1989–1992	Later known as the Weekly Telegraph
North Melbourne Advertiser	North Melbourne	Yes	defunct	1863–1894	
North Melbourne Courier and West Melbourne Advertiser	North Melbourne	Yes	defunct	1895–1913	
North Melbourne Gazette	West Melbourne	Yes	defunct	1894–1901	Previously known as the West Melbourne Guardian
North Suburban Chronicle and General Advertiser	Carlton	No	defunct	1908–1913	
North West Advocate	Footscray	No	defunct	2001–2010	Later known as the North West Weekly
North Western Chronicle and Back Creek, Lamplough, and Clunes Advertiser	Back Creek	No	defunct	1860–1861	Later known as the Talbot Leader and North Western Chronicle
North West Express	Ouyen	No	current	1957–	Previously known as the Ouyen and North West Express
North West Farmer	Mildura	No	defunct	1994–2004	
North West Farmer	Mildura	No	current	2025–	
Northern Advertiser	Moonee Ponds	No	defunct	1922	
Northern Advertiser	Newmarket	No	defunct	1955–1974	Merged with the News (Moonee Ponds) to form the Northern Regional News
Northern Argus	Warracknabeal	No	defunct	1891–1902	Absorbed by the Warracknabeal Herald
Northern District Farmers' Weekly	Cohuna	No	defunct	1961–1967	Later known as the Cohuna Farmers' Weekly
Northern District Standard	Boort	No	defunct	1915–1926	Later known as the Boort Standard
Northern Leader	Preston	No	defunct	2018–2020	Previously known as the Hume Leader
Northern News	Northcote	No	defunct	1980–1985	
Northern Regional News	Melbourne	Yes	defunct	1973–1974	Previously known as the News (Moonee Ponds) and the Northern Advertiser (merged)
Northern Star	Richmond	No	defunct	1977	
Northern Star Weekly	Airport West	No	current	2014–	Previously known as the Northern Weekly
Northern Suburbs News	Geelong	No	defunct	1970	Merged with the Geelong Suburban News to form the Geelong News
Northern Times	Kerang	No	defunct	1971–2015	Later merged with the Cohuna Farmers' Weekly to form the Gannawarra Times
Northern Times	Northcote	No	defunct	1959–1978	Merged with the Preston Post to form the City of Preston Post-Times
Northern Weekly	Briar Hill	No	defunct	2008–2014	Previously known as the Whittlesea Weekly
Northsider	Melbourne	Yes	defunct	2013–2020	
North West Weekender	Tullamarine	No	defunct	2006	
North West Weekly	Airport West	No	defunct	2010–2013	Merged with the Brimbank Weekly to form the Brimbank and North West Weekly
Novosti	Melbourne	Yes	defunct	1963–1985	
Numurkah Guardian and Wunghnu Observer	Numurkah	No	defunct	1884–1885	Merged with the Shepparton Chronicle to form the Goulburn and Murray Farmers' Chronicle
Numurkah Leader	Numurkah	No	current	1895–	
Numurkah Standard and Wunghnu, Cobram, Yarroweyah and Strathmerton Advocate	Numurkah	No	defunct	1887–1918	Absorbed by the Numurkah Leader
Numurkah Standard and Wunghnu, Nathalia and Goulburn District Advocate	Numurkah	No	defunct	1880–1887	Later known as the Numurkah Standard and Wunghnu, Cobram, Yarroweyah and Strathmerton Advocate
Nunawading Gazette Weekend Regional	Mitcham	No	defunct	1971–1972	Related to the Nunawading Gazette
Nunawading News	Mitcham	No	defunct	1970–1973	Later known as the Nunawading Regional News
Nunawading Post	Ferntree Gully	No	defunct	1991–1995	Merged with the Box Hill Post to form the Whitehorse Post
Nunawading Regional Mail	Ringwood	No	defunct	1974–1975	Later known as the Nunawading Gazette
Nunawading Regional News	Ringwood	No	defunct	1973–1974	Later known as the Nunawading Regional Mail
Nunawading Reporter	Box Hill	No	defunct	1945–1964	Previously known as the Blackburn and Mitcham Reporter
Nuovo paese	Coburg	No	defunct	1973–2009	
Nyah and Piangil Times	Nyah	No	defunct	1921–1942	
Nyah Recorder and Bungunyah and Nyerina Echo	Nyah	No	defunct	1921	Absorbed by the Nyah and Piangil Times

== O ==
Newspaper	Town / suburb	Melbourne region	Status	Years of publication	Notes
Oakleigh Advertiser	Brighton	No	defunct	1956–1959	Later known as the Advertiser (Mulgrave and Oakleigh edition)
Oakleigh, Caulfield and Ferntree Gully Times	Oakleigh	No	defunct	1903–1910	Later known as the Oakleigh and Caulfield times, Mulgrave and Ferntree Gully Guardian
Oakleigh and Caulfield Guardian	Oakleigh	No	defunct	1907	Previously known as the Oakleigh Guardian and Fern Tree Gully News
Oakleigh and Caulfield Guardian and Fern Tree Gully News	Oakleigh	No	defunct	1906–1907	Later known as the Oakleigh Guardian and Fern Tree Gully News
Oakleigh and Caulfield Times	Oakleigh	No	defunct	1922–1965	Later absorbed by the Standard Times
Oakleigh and Caulfield Times, Mulgrave and Ferntree Gully Guardian	Oakleigh	No	defunct	1910–1922	Later known as the Oakleigh and Caulfield Times
Oakleigh and Ferntree Gully Times	Oakleigh	No	defunct	1889–1903	Later known as the Oakleigh, Caulfield and Ferntree Gully Times
Oakleigh Guardian and Fern Tree Gully News	Oakleigh	No	defunct	1907	Later known as the Oakleigh and Caulfield Guardian
Oakleigh Leader	North Brighton	No	defunct	1888–1902	Previously known as the Oakleigh Leader and District Record
Oakleigh Leader and District Record	Brighton	No	defunct	1887–1888	Later known as the Oakleigh Leader
Oakleigh Monash Leader	Northcote	No	defunct	2001–2015	Previously known as the Oakleigh Monash Times
Oakleigh Monash Times	Cheltenham	No	defunct	1995–2001	Later known as the Oakleigh Monash Leader
Oakleigh and Mulgrave Guardian and Fern Tree Gully News	Oakleigh	No	defunct	1901–1906	Later known as the Oakleigh and Caulfield Guardian and Fern Tree Gully News
Oakleigh Southern Cross	Brighton	No	defunct	1909–1918	Published in conjunction with the Brighton Southern Cross
Oakleigh Springvale Dandenong Times	Cheltenham	No	defunct	1995–1999	Later known as the Springvale Dandenong Times
Oakleigh-Springvale Times	Cheltenham	No	defunct	1988–1995	Merged with the Dandenong Leader to form the Oakleigh Springvale Dandenong Times, and the Oakleigh Monash Times
Oakleigh Standard Times	Oakleigh	No	defunct	1977–1978	Later known as the Standard Times
Observer (Box Hill edition)	Box Hill	No	defunct	1957–1962	Previously known as the Box Hill Observer
The Observer	Balwyn	No	defunct	1933–1952	
The Observer	Kyneton	No	defunct	1858–1861	Later known as the Kyneton Observer
The Observer	Melbourne	Yes	defunct	1848–1849	
The Observer	Middle Brighton	No	defunct	1933–1934	
Observer, City and Suburban Advertiser	Collingwood	No	defunct	1878–1909	Previously known as the Advertiser and Observer
Observer and Collingwood and Richmond Advertiser	Collingwood	No	defunct	1859	
Observer and County of Bourke Intelligencer	Collingwood	No	defunct	1857–1864	Later known as the Observer and General Advertiser for the Collingwood Municipalities
The Observer and Free Methodist Chronicle	Melbourne	Yes	defunct	1886–1890	
Observer and General Advertiser for the Collingwood Municipalities	Collingwood	No	defunct	1865–1867	Later known as the Manufacturer, Handcraftsman, Agriculturalist and Vigneron's Gazette
O.B.U.	Melbourne	Yes	defunct	1919	
Ocean Grove - Barwon Heads Echo	Ocean Grove	No	defunct	1962–1966	Later known as the Bellarine Peninsula Echo
Ocean Grove Echo	Torquay	No	defunct	2006–2013	Merged with the Bellarine Echo and the Surf Coast Echo to become the Echo (Geelong)
Ocean Grove Voice	Ocean Grove	No	current	2009–	
Oceania	Abbotsford	No	defunct	1986	
Oetoesan penjoeloeh	Melbourne	Yes	defunct	1944	
The Office News	Melbourne	Yes	defunct	1936	
Omeo-East Gippsland Pictorial Standard	Omeo	No	defunct	1964–1969	Later known as the East Gippsland News (Omeo ed)
Omeo Federalist	Melbourne	Yes	defunct	1889	
Omeo News	Omeo	No	defunct	1977–1981	Later known as the East Gippsland News and Market Guide (Omeo ed)
Omeo Standard	Omeo	No	defunct	1945–1964	Later merged with the Bairnsdale Advertiser Week-end Pictorial News to form the Omeo-East Gippsland Pictorial Standard
Omeo Standard and Mining Gazette	Omeo	No	defunct	1893–1942	Later known as the Omeo Standard
Omeo Telegraph	Omeo	No	defunct	1884	Later known as the Omeo Telegraph and North Gippsland Review
Omeo Telegraph and East Gippsland Review	Omeo	No	defunct	1891–1896	Later absorbed by the Omeo Standard and Mining Gazette
Omeo Telegraph and North Gippsland Review	Omeo	No	defunct	1884–1891	Later known as the Omeo Telegraph and East Gippsland Review
Omoyeneia	Black Rock	No	defunct	1988–1990	
Once-a-week	Melbourne	Yes	defunct	1881–1894	Later known as the Weekly Budget
The One Big Union Herald	Melbourne	Yes	defunct	1918–1925	Later known as the Revolutionary Socialist
Oranje	Melbourne	Yes	defunct	1942–1946	
Oriana News	Melbourne	Yes	defunct	1959–1986	
Ormond News	Cheltenham	No	defunct	1939–1965	Merged with the Bentleigh News, the Bentleigh Standard, and the City of Moorabbin News Pictorial to form the City of Moorabbin Standard News Pictorial
Osvit	Footscray	No	defunct	1971–1976	Later known as Hrvatski list
Our Daily News	Castlemaine	No	defunct	1862–1865	Later known as Daily News and Chewton, Maldon, Guildford, Newstead, Muckleford, Yandoit, Vaughan, Tarilta, Metcalf, Malmsbury, and Taradale Advertiser
Our Newspaper	Richmond	No	defunct	1982–1991	
Our Weekly	Frankston	No	defunct	1922–1925	Absorbed by the Moorabbin News
Outer Circle Mirror	East Kew	No	defunct	1953–1966	Merged with the Doncaster Mirror to form the Doncaster and Outer Circle Mirror
Outlet	Burwood	No	defunct	1972	Later known as Weed
Outpost	Melbourne	Yes	defunct	1900–1901	
Outtrim News and Miners' Gazette : Moyarra, Kongwak, Jumbunna, Grantville, Blackwood, Inverloch, and Tarwin Advertiser	Outtrim	No	defunct	1897–1899	Later known as the Outtrim News and Miners' Representative
Outtrim News and Miners' Representative	Outtrim	No	defunct	1899–1909	Previously known as the Outtrim News and Miners' Gazette
Ouyen Mail	Ouyen	No	defunct	1915–1941	Later absorbed by the Ouyen and North West Express
Ouyen Mail and Central Mallee Advertiser	Ouyen	No	defunct	1911–1915	Later known as the Ouyen Mail
Ouyen and North West Express	Ouyen	No	defunct	1918–1957	Later known as the North West Express
Ovens and Murray Advertiser	Beechworth	No	current	1855–	
Ovens Register and Mining, Commercial and Agricultural Directory	Beechworth	No	defunct	1875–1918	Absorbed by the Ovens and Murray Advertiser
Ovens Spectator	Beechworth	No	defunct	1868–1885	
Oxygen	Melbourne	Yes	defunct	1868	
OZ Hit Magazine	Box Hill	No	defunct	2000–2020	Supplement to Asian Multimedia

== P ==
Newspaper	Town / suburb	Melbourne region	Status	Years of publication	Notes
Pacific Daily	West Melbourne	Yes	current	2011–	
The Pacific Times	Melbourne	Yes	defunct	1999–2001	
The Pacific Times (Weekly)	Footscray	No	defunct	1994–1999	
Pahana	Dandenong	No	current	2003–	
Pakenham Cardinia Leader	Cranbourne	No	defunct	2005–2013	Previously known as the Pakenham Leader
Pakenham-Berwick Gazette	Pakenham	No	defunct	1987–1994	Later known as the Berwick-Pakenham Gazette
Pakenham Gazette	Pakenham	No	current	2012–	Previously known as the Gazette, Pakenham
Pakenham Gazette and Berwick City News	Pakenham	No	defunct	1974–1987	Later splits to form the Pakenham-Berwick Gazette and the Berwick City News
Pakenham Gazette and Berwick Shire News	Pakenham East	No	defunct	1917–1974	Later known as the Pakenham Gazette and Berwick City News
Pakenham Journal	Dandenong	No	defunct	2003–2010	Later known as the Pakenham Weekly
Pakenham Leader	Cranbourne	No	defunct	2003–2005	Later known as the Pakenham Cardinia Leader
Pakenham Officer Star News	Pakenham	No	current	2017–	Previously known as the News, Pakenham, Officer
Pakenham Weekly	Dandenong	No	defunct	2010–2013	Merged with the Casey Weekly Berwick to form the Casey Weekly
Pandora's Box	Burwood	No	defunct	1974	Later known as Banter
Pandora's Box	Burwood	No	defunct	1977–1981	Previously known as Banter
Paynesville Post	Bairnsdale	No	defunct	1996–1999	Supplement to the Bairnsdale Advertiser
Peninsula Alternative	Mornington	No	defunct	2008	
Peninsula Beacon	Queenscliff	No	defunct	1930–1936	
Peninsula Flier	Mornington	No	defunct	1996–1998	Merged with the Mornington Flyer to form the Mornington Peninsula Flier
Peninsula Independent News	Hastings	No	defunct	1985–1987	Later known as the Mornington Peninsula Independent
Peninsula Journal Weekender	Dandenong	No	defunct	2003–2006	Absorbed by the Frankston Independent
Peninsula Local News	Rosebud	No	defunct	2001	Previously known as Southern Peninsula Local
Peninsula News	Dandenong	No	defunct	1966–1967	Later known as the News (Frankston)
Peninsula News	Frankston	No	defunct	1951	
Peninsula Post	Cheltenham	No	defunct	1985–1988	Later known as the Peninsula-Westernport Post
Peninsula Post	Mornington	No	defunct	1913–1972	Later known as the Peninsula-Westernport Post
Peninsula Post (Phillip Island edition)	Mornington	No	defunct	1949–1950	Previously known as the Phillip Island Post
Peninsula Weekly	Mornington	No	defunct	2013	Previously known as the Western Port Weekly, and the Peninsula Weekly Mornington (merged)
Peninsula Weekly Mornington	Mornington	No	defunct	2010–2013	Merged with the Western Port Weekly to form the Peninsula Weekly
Peninsula-Westernport Post	Mornington	No	defunct	1972–1985	Later known as the Peninsula Post
Peninsula-Westernport Post	Cheltenham	No	defunct	1988	Absorbed by the Mornington Leader
Penshurst Free Press	Penshurst	No	defunct	1901–1981	
Penshurst Times and Mount Rouse Observer	Penshurst	No	defunct	1898–1899	
People's Daily	Melbourne	Yes	defunct	1903–1904	
People's Tribune	Melbourne	Yes	defunct	1883–1886	
People's Weekly	Melbourne	Yes	defunct	1889–1890	
Philippine Mabuhay	Bundoora	No	defunct	1982–1984	
Philippine Times	Melbourne	Yes	current	1990–	
Phillip Island Post	Mornington	No	defunct	1949	Later known as the Peninsula Post (Phillip Island edition)
Phillip Island Standard	Frankston	No	defunct	1921–1922	Later known as the Phillip Island Standard and French Island, Crib Point, San Remo and Westernport Advocate
Phillip Island Standard and French Island, Crib Point, San Remo and Westernport Advocate	Frankston	No	defunct	1922–1930	Previously known as the Phillip Island Standard
Phillip Island Star	Cowes	No	defunct	1988–1989	
Phillip Island Times	Cowes	No	defunct	1932–1935	
The Phoenix	Eltham	No	defunct	2009–2010	Later known as the Melbourne Observer
Phos	Melbourne	Yes	defunct	1936–1973	
Piangil and Kooloonong Cultivator	Nyah	No	defunct	1921	Absorbed by the Nyah and Piangil Times
Pi︠a︡tyĭ kontinent	Richmond	No	defunct	1986	
The Pilot	Upper Ferntree Gully	No	defunct	1921–1922	
Pinoy News	Footscray	No	defunct	2007–2008	
Pirsos = The Greek torch monthly review	South Melbourne	Yes	defunct	1985–1990	Later known as Neos Pirsos
Pitfield Banner and Hollybush Times	Kaleno	No	defunct	1900–1922	Previously known as the Kaleno Banner
Pitfield Miner	Rokewood	No	defunct	1898–1899	Later known as the Pitfield Miner and Berringa Times
Pitfield Miner and Berringa Times	Pitfield	No	defunct	1898–1902	Previously known as the Pitfield Miner
The Pleasant Creek Chronicle : Stawell, Glenorchy, Great Western, Horsham and Moyston Advertiser	Stawell	No	defunct	1867–1877	Later known as the Stawell Chronicle and Wimmera News
Pleasant Creek News and Stawell Chronicle	Stawell	No	defunct	1879–1895	Later known as the Stawell News and Pleasant Creek Chronicle
Pleasant Creek News and Wimmera Advertiser	Pleasant Creek	No	defunct	1868–1879	Merged with the Stawell Chronicle and Wimmera News to form the Pleasant Creek News and Stawell Chronicle
Point Cook Banner	Werribee	No	defunct	2007–2010	Later known as the Point Cook Weekly
Point Cook Weekly	Werribee	No	defunct	2010–2013	Later known as the Wyndham Weekly
Point Cook Wyndham Leader	Newport	No	defunct	2010–2016	
Pokret	St Albans	No	defunct	1990	Previously known as Hrvatski tjednik
Port Fairy Gazette	Port Fairy	No	defunct	1890–1967	Later known as the Gazette (Port Fairy)
Port Fairy Gazette	Port Fairy	No	defunct	1983–1989	Later known as the Gazette (Port Fairy)
Port Fairy News	Port Fairy	No	defunct	1910–1912	Absorbed by the Port Fairy Gazette
Port Fairy Times and Macarthur News	Port Fairy	No	defunct	1917–1918	Absorbed by the Port Fairy Gazette
Port Gazette	Port Melbourne	No	defunct	1896	
The Portland Bay Examiner and Chronicle of Australia Felix	Portland	No	defunct	1845	
Portland Express	Heywood	No	defunct	1967–1973	Merged with the Heywood Express to form the Heywood Portland Express
Portland Express and Western District Advertiser	Portland	No	defunct	1874–1876	Later known as the Portland Guardian
Portland Gazette and Belfast Advertiser	Portland	No	defunct	1844–1849	Later known as the Belfast Gazette and Portland and Warnambool Advertiser
Portland Guardian	Portland	No	defunct	1876–1964	Later known as the Portland Observer
Portland Guardian and Normanby General Advertiser	Portland	No	defunct	1842–1876	Later known as the Portland Guardian
Portland Herald and Belfast and Warrnambool Advocate	Portland	No	defunct	1850–1855	
Portland Mercury and Normanby Advertiser	Portland	No	defunct	1842–1843	Later known as the Portland Mercury and Port Fairy Register
Portland Mercury and Port Fairy Register	Portland	No	defunct	1843–1844	Later known as the Portland Gazette and Belfast Advertiser
Portland Mirror and Western District Advertising Guide	Portland	No	defunct	1882–1886	Absorbed by the Portland Guardian
Portland Observer	Portland	No	defunct	1920–1968	Later known as the Portland Observer and Guardian
Portland Observer and Guardian	Portland	No	current	1968–	Previously known as the Portland Observer
Portland Observer and Normanby Advertiser	Portland	No	defunct	1890–1920	Later known as the Portland Observer
Port Melbourne Standard	Port Melbourne	No	defunct	1914–1920	Previously known as the Standard (Port Melbourne)
Port Melbourne Tribune	Port Melbourne	No	defunct	1889–1894	Absorbed by the Standard (Port Melbourne)
Port Phillip Gazeteer	Melbourne	Yes	defunct	1844	Later known as the Standard and Port Phillip Gazeteer
Port Phillip Gazette	Melbourne	Yes	defunct	1838–1845	Later known as the Port Phillip Gazette and Settler's Journal
Port Phillip Gazette	Melbourne	Yes	defunct	1851	Later known as the Times (Melbourne)
Port Phillip Gazette and Settler's Journal	Melbourne	Yes	defunct	1845–1850	Later known as the Port Phillip Gazette
Port Phillip Herald	Port Phillip	Yes	defunct	1840–1848	Later known as the Melbourne Morning Herald and General Daily Advertiser
Port Phillip Herald. Extraordinary	Melbourne	Yes	defunct	1840–1848	Supplement to the Port Phillip Herald
Port Phillip Leader	Armadale	No	defunct	1994–2020	Previously known as the Caulfield-St Kilda Leader
Port Phillip Patriot and Melbourne Advertiser	Melbourne	Yes	defunct	1839–1845	Later known as the Port Phillip Patriot and Morning Advertiser
Port Phillip Patriot and Morning Advertiser	Melbourne	Yes	defunct	1845–1848	Absorbed the Standard and Port Phillip Gazeteer to later form the Melbourne Daily News and Port Phillip Patriot
Port Phillip Review Local	Docklands	No	defunct	2012–2013	Merged with the Bayside Review Local and the Weekly Review (Bayside) to become the Weekly Review (Bayside and Port Phillip)
Portsea Flyer	Red Hill	No	defunct	1989	
Possum	Melbourne	Yes	defunct	1874	
Post (Chelsea edition)	Mornington	No	defunct	1950	Previously known as the Chelsea Post
Postscript	Richmond	No	defunct	1969	Later known as Postscript Weekender
Postscript Weekender : your independent weekly	South Yarra	No	defunct	1969–1974	Later known as the New Weekender
Powlett Express and Victorian State Coalfields Advertiser	Dalyston	No	defunct	1909–1938	Later known as the Powlett Express, Wonthaggi and Victorian State Coalfields Advertiser
Powlett Express, Wonthaggi	Wonthaggi	No	defunct	1948–1952	Later known as the Wonthaggi Express
Powlett Express, Wonthaggi and Victorian State Coalfields Advertiser	Wonthaggi	No	defunct	1938–1948	Later known as the Powlett Express, Wonthaggi
Prahran Chronicle	Prahran	No	defunct	1894–1920	Previously known as the Chronicle, South Yarra Gazette, Toorak times and Malvern Standard
Prahran Chronicle and St. Kilda, Toorak, South Yarra and Windsor Record	Windsor	No	defunct	1882–1889	Later known as the Chronicle, South Yarra Gazette, Toorak times and Malvern Standard
Prahran and Malvern News	Elsternwick	No	defunct	1951–1952	Later known as the Prahran News
Prahran and Malvern Southern Cross	Prahran	No	defunct	1986–1988	Splits to form the Prahran Southern Cross, and the Malvern Southern Cross
Prahran News	Elsternwick	No	defunct	1952–1959	Merged with the Carnegie Courier, the Caulfield-Elsternwick Advertiser, and the St Kilda News to form the Southern Advertiser
Prahran and St Kilda Advertiser	Prahran	No	defunct	1857	
Prahran Southern Cross	Prahran	No	defunct	1988	Later known as the Toorak, South Yarra, Prahran Southern Cross
Prahran Telegraph	Prahran	No	defunct	1889–1930	
Prahran Telegraph (Malvern Argus ed)	Prahran	No	defunct	1902–1920	Edition of the Prahran Telegraph. Previously known as the Malvern Argus
Prahran Telegraph (St Kilda ed)	Prahran	No	defunct	1903–1920	Edition of the Prahran Telegraph. Previously known as the St Kilda Advertiser
Prahran, Toorak, South Yarra Southern Cross	Prahran	No	defunct	1994	Merged with the Southern Cross Malvern, Armadale to form the Southern Cross Prahran, Toorak, Malvern
Prahran Times	Prahran	No	defunct	1901	
Prat : Prahran, Rusden and Toorak Campus Forum	Prahran	No	defunct	1990	Later known as Flash
Pravasa Bharathi	Robinson	No	defunct	2012–2013	
Preston Leader	Northcote	No	defunct	1888–1938	Later merges with the Northcote Leader to form the Leader (Northcote)
Preston Leader	Northcote	No	defunct	2001–2020	Previously known as the Preston Post-Times
Preston Northcote Whittlesea Northerner	South Melbourne	Yes	defunct	1987–1990	
Preston Post	Preston	No	defunct	1914–1915	
Preston Post	Northcote	No	defunct	1940–1978	Later merged with the Northern Times to form the City of Preston Post-Times
Preston Post-Times	Northcote	No	defunct	1988–2001	Later known as the Preston Leader
Preston Progress	Preston	No	defunct	1924–1930	Absorbed by the Preston Leader
Producer	Warrnambool	No	defunct	1945–1953	Later known as the Australian Producer
Progress	North Fitzroy	No	defunct	1889–1890	
Progressive Review	Cannons Creek	No	defunct	1980–1983	
Progress Leader	Hawthorn	No	defunct	2001–2020	Previously known as the Progress Press (Glen Iris)
Progress Press	Ashburton	No	defunct	1946–1963	Splits to form the Progress Press (Camberwell) and the Progress Press (Waverley)
Progress Press	Glen Iris	No	defunct	1968–2001	Later known as the Progress Leader
Progress Press (City of Camberwell edition)	Ashburton	No	defunct	1963–1968	Later known as the Progress Press (Glen Iris)
Progress Press (City of Waverley edition)	Ashburton	No	defunct	1963–1970	Later known as Waverley Progress
Prom Coast News	Foster	No	current	2025–	
Punch	East Melbourne	Yes	defunct	1900–1921	Later known as New Punch
Punch	East Melbourne	Yes	defunct	1921–1925	Absorbed by Table Talk
Public Opinion	Melbourne	Yes	defunct	1911–1915	
Pyramid Hill Advertiser	Pyramid Hill	No	defunct	1888–1971	Later merged with the Kerang New Times to form the Northern Times
Pyrenees Advocate	Beaufort	No	current	1994–	Previously known as the Riponshire Advocate, and the Avoca and District News (merged)

== Q ==
Newspaper	Town / suburb	Melbourne region	Status	Years of publication	Notes
Quambatook Farmer's Journal	Quambatook	No	defunct	1910–1913	Merged with the Quambatook Times and Ultima Courier to form the Quambatook Times
Quambatook Herald	Quambatook	No	defunct	1901–1903	Merged with the Boort Standard to form the Boort Standard and Quambatook Herald
Quambatook Herald and County Tatchera Advertiser	Quambatook	No	defunct	1898–1901	Later known as the Quambatook Herald
Quambatook Times	Quambatook	No	defunct	1913–1961	Later merged with the Boort Standard to form the Boort Standard and Quambatook Times
Quambatook Times and Ultima Courier	Quambatook	No	defunct	1910–1913	Merged with the Quambatook Farmer's Journal to form the Quambatook Times
Queenscliffe Herald	Wallington	No	defunct	1999–2022	
Queenscliff Pilot	Colac	No	defunct	1947–1968	
Queenscliff Sentinel	Queenscliff	No	defunct	1884–1885	Later known as the Queenscliff Sentinel, Drysdale, Portarlington and Sorrento Advertiser
Queenscliff Sentinel, Drysdale, Portarlington and Sorrento Advertiser	Queenscliff	No	defunct	1885–1894	Later known as the Sentinel, Drysdale, Portarlington, Queenscliff and Sorrento
Queenscliff Sentinel, Drysdale, Portarlington, Sorrento Advertiser	Queenscliff	No	defunct	1899–1919	Previously known as the Sentinel, Drysdale, Portarlington, Queenscliff and Sorrento
Queenscliff Sentinel, Drysdale, St. Leonards, Sorrento, Portsea, Portarlington, Point Lonsdale and Bellarineshire Advertiser	Queenscliff	No	defunct	1882–1884	Later known as the Queenscliff Sentinel

== R ==
Newspaper	Town / suburb	Melbourne region	Status	Years of publication	Notes
Racing Guide	North Melbourne	Yes	defunct	1966–1967	Previously known as the Guide
Racing Review	Melbourne	Yes	defunct	1925–1926	
The 'Racing Review' by Peter Pan	Melbourne	Yes	defunct	1948–1949	
Radio Times-Daily	Melbourne	Yes	defunct	1942	Related to the Radio Times
Radio Times Radio Daily	Melbourne	Yes	defunct	1942	Related to the Radio Times
Rainbow Argus	Rainbow	No	defunct	1906–1962	Later known as the Rainbow News
Rainbow Argus	Rainbow	No	defunct	1992–2005	Later known as the Rainbow-Jeparit Argus
Rainbow-Jeparit Argus	Rainbow	No	defunct	2006–2013	Previously known as the Rainbow Argus
Rainbow News	Rainbow	No	defunct	1962–1992	Later known as the Rainbow Argus
Ralph Phillipson's Australian Times and Farmers' Journal	Melbourne	Yes	defunct	1889	
Ranges Leader	Lilydale	No	defunct	2001–2002	Later known as the Free Press Leader
The Ranges Trader	Monbulk	No	defunct	1997–1999	Later known as the Ranges Trader Mail
Ranges Trader Mail	Monbulk	No	defunct	1999–2020	Later known as the Ranges Trader Star Mail
Ranges Trader Star Mail	Healesville	No	current	2020–	Previously known as the Ranges Trader Mail
Real Estate and Homemakers Guide	Melbourne	Yes	defunct	1985–1986	Later known as the Victorian Homemaker's Guide
Real Estate News	Pakenham	No	defunct	1992	Later known as the South Eastern Real Estate News
Rebellious	Bundoora	No	defunct	1989–2006	
Record	Emerald Hill	No	defunct	1868–1872	Later known as the Record and Emerald Hill and Sandridge Advertiser
The Record	Emerald Hill	No	defunct	1881–1979	Previously known as the Record and Emerald Hill and Sandridge Advertiser
The Record and East Bourke Boroughs Advertiser	Brunswick	No	defunct	1862	
Record and Emerald Hill and Sandridge Advertiser	Emerald Hill	No	defunct	1868–1881	Later known as the Record
Red Gum Courier : Nathalia and Districts Newspaper	Nathalia	No	current	1996–	
Red Hill Flyer	Red Hill	No	defunct	1988–1993	Later known as the Southern Flyer
Reformer and Northern Suburbs Advertiser	Brunswick	No	defunct	1887–1902	Previously known as the Brunswick and Coburg Reformer and East Bourke Boroughs Advertiser
The Regional	Sunbury	No	defunct	1988–1994	Later known as the Sunbury Regional
Regional Chadstone Progress	Oakleigh	No	defunct	1983	Later known as Regional Progress
Regional News	Sunbury	No	defunct	1980–1982	Merged with the Regional News (Gisborne, Woodend, Macedon Ranges ed) to form the Regional News (Gisborne ed)
Regional News (Gisborne ed)	Sunbury	No	defunct	1982–1988	Later known as the Regional (Sunbury)
Regional News (Gisborne, Woodend, Macedon Ranges ed)	Woodend	No	defunct	1980–1981	Merged with the Regional News to form the Regional News (Gisborne ed)
Regional News-Gazette	Glenroy	No	defunct	1969–1978	Splits to form the Melton Mirror, the Gisborne Gazette, and the Sunbury News
Regional Progress	Oakleigh	No	defunct	1983–1988	Later known as Caulfield-Malvern Progress
Regional Times Extra	Mildura	No	defunct	1984–1994	Issues as a supplement to the Sea Lake and Wycheproof Times Ensign, the Sentinel (Robinvale), the Guardian (Swan Hill), the Northern Times, and Mildura Midweek
The Reporter	Box Hill	No	defunct	1889–1925	Later known as the Box Hill Reporter
The Reporter	Box Hill	No	defunct	1964–1968	Later known as the Box Hill Gazette
Reservoir Times	Northcote	No	defunct	1953–1959	Later known as the Northern Times
The Review	Fishermen's Bend	No	defunct	1971–1972	Merged with the Nation (Sydney) to form the Nation Review
Review	Prahran	No	defunct	1981	Previously known as Nation Review
Revolution	Collingwood	No	defunct	2000	
Richmond Advocate	Melbourne	Yes	defunct	1972–1975	
Richmond Australian	Richmond	No	defunct	1883–1916	Previously known as the Australian
Richmond City News	South Melbourne	Yes	defunct	1991–1993	Previously known as the Toorak Times (Melbourne City edition)
Richmond Courier	Richmond	No	defunct	1888–1889	
Richmond Free Press and General Advertiser	Richmond	No	defunct	1871–1872	
Richmond Guardian	Richmond	No	defunct	1876–1936	
Richmond, Hawthorn, Camberwell Chronicle	Richmond	No	defunct	1932–1945	Previously known as the Richmond, Hawthorn, Camberwell Weekly
Richmond, Hawthorn, Camberwell Weekly	Richmond	No	defunct	1930–1932	Later known as the Richmond, Hawthorn, Camberwell Chronicle
Richmond Herald	Richmond	No	defunct	1989–1990	
Richmond Melbourne Times	Carlton	No	defunct	1992	Later known as the Melbourne Times in Richmond
Richmond News	Richmond	No	defunct	1946–1966	
Richmond Scene	Richmond	No	defunct	1978	
Richmond Times	South Carlton	No	defunct	1983–1990	
Richmond Voice	Prahran	No	defunct	1975–1977	
Richmond Weekly	Richmond	No	defunct	1927–1930	Later known as the Richmond, Hawthorn, Camberwell Weekly
Ringwood Borough News	Blackburn	No	defunct	1930–1931	
Ringwood City News	Mitcham	No	defunct	1984–1985	
Ringwood and Croydon Chronicle	Lilydale	No	defunct	1914–1929	
Ringwood-Croydon Gazette	Mitcham	No	defunct	1972–1975	Later known as the Croydon Mooroolbark Gazette
Ringwood, Croydon, Lilydale and Upper Yarra Gazette	Mitcham	No	defunct	1971–1972	Later known as the Ringwood-Croydon Gazette
Ringwood and Croydon Mail	Ringwood	No	defunct	1924–1925	Splits to form the Ringwood Mail and Warrandyte Gazette, and the Croydon Mail and Mt. Dandenong Advertiser
Ringwood-Croydon Mail	Ringwood	No	defunct	1967–1983	Splits to form the Ringwood Mail, and the Croydon Mail
Ringwood Croydon News	Ringwood	No	defunct	1971–1974	Later known as the Ringwood Croydon Mail
Ringwood Gazette	Mitcham	No	defunct	1965–1971	Later known as the Ringwood, Croydon, Lilydale and Upper Yarra Gazette
Ringwood Mail	Ringwood	No	defunct	1939–1967	Merged with the Croydon Mail to form the Ringwood-Croydon Mail
Ringwood Mail	Ringwood	No	defunct	1983–1996	Merged with the Croydon Mail to form the Maroondah Mail
Ringwood Mail and Warrandyte Gazette	Ringwood	No	defunct	1926–1939	Later known as the Ringwood Mail
Ringwood Post	Lilydale	No	defunct	1988–1995	Merged with Croydon Post to form Maroondah Post
Riponshire Advocate	Beaufort	No	defunct	1874–1994	Later merged with the Avoca and District News to form the Pyrenees Advocate
Rising Tide	Fitzroy	No	defunct	1948–1949	
Riverine Herald: Echuca and Moama Advertiser	Echuca	No	current	1863–	
Robert Clarke's Centennial News and Farmer's Review	Melbourne	Yes	defunct	1889	
Robinvale Argus	Ouyen	No	defunct	1957–1959	Later known as the Robinvale and Manangatang Argus
Robinvale and Manangatang Argus	Ouyen	No	defunct	1959–1969	Previously known as the Robinvale Argus
Rochester Express	Rochester	No	defunct	1876–1942	Previously known as the Rochester Express and Runnymede, Corop and Timmering Advertiser
Rochester Express and Runnymede, Corop and Timmering Advertiser	Rochester	No	defunct	1874–1876	Later known as the Rochester Express
Rochester Irrigator : the Farmers' and Settlers' Journal	Rochester	No	defunct	1912–1960	Later known as the Irrigator
Rokewood Gazette	Rokewood	No	defunct	1902–1903	Previously known as the Rokewood Gazette, Corindhap News and Pitfield Plains Advertiser
Rokewood Gazette and Corindhap News	Rokewood	No	defunct	1896–1897	Later known as the Rokewood Gazette, Corindhap News and Pitfield Plains Advertiser
Rokewood Gazette, Corindhap News and Pitfield Plains Advertiser	Rokewood	No	defunct	1897–1902	Later known as the Rokewood Gazette
Rokewood Reformer and Corindhap Chronicle	Kaleno	No	defunct	1901	
Romsey Examiner	Romsey	No	defunct	1884–1965	Later merged with the Gisborne Gazette, the Sunbury News, and the Lancefield Mercury and West Bourke Agricultural Record to form the Mount Macedon and Districts Regional News-Gazette
Rosanna Diamond Valley News	Northcote	No	defunct	1959–1964	Later known as the Diamond Valley News
Rosebud News	Tyabb	No	defunct	2007–2010	Merged with the Rye News and the Sorrento News to form the Southern Peninsula News
Rosedale Courier	Rosedale	No	defunct	1889–1890	Later known as the Rosedale Courier and Carrajung and Denison Advocate
Rosedale Courier	Rosedale	No	defunct	1899–1954	Previously known as the Rosedale Courier and Carrajung and Denison Advocate
Rosedale Courier and Carrajung and Denison Advocate	Rosedale	No	defunct	1890–1899	Later known as the Rosedale Courier
Royal Mail Budget	Melbourne	Yes	defunct	1910–1911	
Rundschau	Chilwell	No	defunct	1954–1960	Absorbed by Anker
Rupanyup Spectator and Lubeck, Banyena, Rich Avon, and Lallat Advertiser	Rupanyup	No	defunct	1885–1954	
Rural Review	Melbourne	Yes	defunct	1935	
Rushworth Chronicle	Rushworth	No	defunct	1963–1977	Previously known as the Murchison Advertiser, and the Rushworth Chronicle and Waranga Advertiser (merged)
Rushworth Chronicle and Goulburn Advertiser	Rushworth	No	defunct	1886	Later known as the Rushworth Chronicle and Waranga Advertiser
Rushworth Chronicle and Waranga Advertiser	Rushworth	No	defunct	1886–1962	Merged with the Murchison Advertiser to form the Rushworth Chronicle
Rutherglen Miner and Howlong and Wahgunyah Times	Rutherglen	No	defunct	1903–1912	
Russkai︠a︡ pravda	St Albans	No	defunct	1961–1968	
Rutherglen Sun	Rutherglen	No	defunct	1885	Later known as the Rutherglen Sun and Murray Valley Advertiser
Rutherglen Sun and Chiltern Valley Advertiser	Rutherglen	No	defunct	1886–1979	Later known as the Sun, Corowa-Rutherglen
Rutherglen Sun and Murray Valley Advertiser	Rutherglen	No	defunct	1886	Later known as the Rutherglen Sun and Chiltern Valley Advertiser
Rutherglen and Wahgunyah News	Rutherglen	No	defunct	1894–1901	Absorbed by the Rutherglen Sun and Chiltern Valley Advertiser
Rye News	Tyabb	No	defunct	2008–2010	Merged with Rosebud News and Sorrento News to form the Southern Peninsula News

== S ==
Newspaper	Town / suburb	Melbourne region	Status	Years of publication	Notes
St Albans-Deer Park Observer	Glenroy	No	defunct	1962–1964	Later known as the St Albans and Outer Western Observer
St Albans Keilor Advocate	Footscray	No	defunct	1988–1995	Merged with the Sunshine Western-Suburbs Advocate to form the Advocate (Brimbank edition)
St Albans Observer	Glenroy	No	defunct	1958–1962	Later known as the St Albans-Deer Park Observer
St Albans and Outer Western Observer	Glenroy	No	defunct	1964–1969	Merged with the Broadmeadows and Keilor Observer to become the Keilor Messenger
St Arnaud Mercury	St Arnaud	No	defunct	1864–1981	Later merged with the Charlton Tribune to form the North Central News
St James and Devenish Herald	Dookie	No	defunct	1885–1905	
St Kilda Advertiser	Prahran	No	defunct	1872–1902	Later known as the Prahran Telegraph (St Kilda ed)
St Kilda and Balaclava News	Elsternwick	No	defunct	1921–1924	
St Kilda and Caulfield Southern Cross	North Brighton	No	defunct	1906–1927	Previously known as the Caulfield and Elsternwick Times
St Kilda Chronicle	Prahran	No	defunct	1906–1920	
St Kilda Chronicle and Prahran, Toorak, South Yarra and Windsor Record	Windsor	No	defunct	1882–1889	Later known as the Chronicle (Windsor)
St Kilda and District Guide	St Kilda	No	defunct	1930	
St Kilda Mercury	St Kilda	No	defunct	1898–1902	Absorbed by the St Kilda Advertiser
St Kilda News	North Brighton	No	defunct	1959	Merged with the Carnegie Courier, the Caulfield-Elsternwick Advertiser, and the Prahran News to form the Southern Advertiser
St Kilda News	St Kilda	No	defunct	2011–2020	
St Kilda-Prahran News	Elsternwick	No	defunct	1950–1951	Later known as the Prahran and Malvern News
St Kilda Times	St Kilda	No	defunct	1888	Later known as the Times (St Kilda)
Sandhurst Bee	Sandhurst	No	defunct	1860–1861	
SandPiper	Bendigo	No	current	2004–	
Sandridge Standard and Emerald Hill Advertiser	North Sandridge	No	defunct	1883–1884	Later known as the Standard (Port Melbourne)
Sandringham and Brighton Advertiser	Cheltenham	No	defunct	1971–1983	Later known as the Advertiser (Cheltenham)
Sandringham-Brighton Advertiser	Cheltenham	No	defunct	1988–1999	Later known as the Bayside Advertiser
Sandringham Chronicle	Mordialloc	No	defunct	2017–2018	
Sandringham News	Cheltenham	No	defunct	1918–1925	Later known as the City of Sandringham News
Sandringham News	Cheltenham	No	defunct	1937–1946	Merged with the Black Rock News and the Hampton News to form the News (Sandringham)
Sandringham Rambler	Cheltenham	No	defunct	1904–1905	
Sandringham Southern Cross	Brighton	No	defunct	1909–1935	
San Remo Times and Phillip Island and Bass Valley Advertiser	San Remo	No	defunct	1896–1898	Later known as the Western Port Times
Saturday Night	Melbourne	Yes	defunct	1880–1881	Later known as Once-a-week
Saturday Paper	Collingwood	No	current	2014–	
Sea Lake Times and Berriwillock Advertiser	Sea Lake	No	defunct	1897–1941	Later known as the Sea Lake Times and Primary Producers' Advocate
Sea Lake Times and Primary Producers' Advocate	Sea Lake	No	defunct	1941–1970	Later merged with the New Wycheproof Ensign to form the Sea Lake and Wycheproof Times Ensign
Sea Lake and Wycheproof Times Ensign	Sea Lake	No	current	1971–	Previously known as the Sea Lake Times and Primary Producers' Advocate, and the New Wycheproof Ensign (merged)
Seaside News	Carrum	No	defunct	1913–1922	Later known as the Borough of Carrum News
Sentinel	Korumburra	No	current	2020–	Previously known as the South Gippsland Sentinel Times
The Sentinel	Wonthaggi	No	defunct	1955–1957	Later known as the Sentinel Wonthaggi
Sentinel, Drysdale, Portarlington, Queenscliff and Sorrento	Queenscliff	No	defunct	1894–1899	Later known as the Queenscliff Sentinel, Drysdale, Portarlington, Sorrento Advertiser
The Sentinel Wonthaggi	Wonthaggi	No	defunct	1960–1965	Later known as the Wonthaggi Sentinel
Serendib = heḷa haḍa	North Balwyn	No	defunct	1993	
Serendib news	Dandenong South	No	current	2002–	
Service	Melbourne	Yes	defunct	1896–1901	
Sesimiz	Mentone	No	defunct	1988–1989	
Seven Days	Alphington	No	defunct	1986	
Seymour Advertiser	Seymour	No	defunct	1993	Later known as the Seymour-Nagambie Advertiser
Seymour Chronicle	Yea	No	defunct	1991–1992	
Seymour Express and Goulburn Valley, Avenel, Graytown, Nagambie, Tallarook and Yea Advertiser	Seymour	No	defunct	1872–1924	Absorbed by the Seymour Telegraph
Seymour-Nagambie Advertiser	Seymour	No	defunct	1993–2013	Previously known as the Seymour Advertiser
Seymour Telegraph	Seymour	No	defunct	1872–2014	Later known as the Telegraph (Seymour)
S. & F. Tuckfield's Centennial Gazette	Melbourne	Yes	defunct	1889	
Shalom	Elsternwick	No	defunct	1981–1985	
Shearers' and General Laborers' Record	Melbourne	Yes	defunct	1891–1893	Absorbed by the Worker
The Shearers' Record : a monthly journal.	Melbourne	Yes	defunct	1888–1891	Later known as Shearers' and General Laborers' Record
Shepparton Advertiser	Shepparton	No	defunct	1887–1953	Later absorbed by the Shepparton News
Shepparton Advertiser and Moira and Rodney Farmers' Chronicle : an agricultural journal circulating throughout the Goulburn Valley	Shepparton	No	defunct	1886–1887	Later known as the Shepparton Advertiser
Shepparton Adviser	Shepparton	No	defunct	1984–2008	Later known as the Adviser
Shepparton Chronicle	Shepparton	No	defunct	1882–1885	Merged with the Numurkah Guardian and Wunghnu Observer to form the Goulburn and Murray Farmers' Chronicle
Shepparton News	Shepparton	No	current	1877–	
Sherbrooke and District Free Press	Belgrave	No	defunct	1989	Later known as The Free Press
Shipping Gazette	Melbourne	Yes	defunct	1888	Later known as the Melbourne Shipping Gazette and Daily Diary
Shipping Gazette	Melbourne	Yes	defunct	1891–1894	Later known as the Daily Shipping Gazette
The Shipping Index : Australasia and New Zealand	Melbourne	Yes	defunct	1902	Later known as the Shipping Index and Importers and Exporters Journal
Shipping Index and Importers and Exporters Journal	Melbourne	Yes	defunct	1902–1904	Merged with the Daily Australasian Shipping News to form the Daily Shipping Index and Importers and Exporters Journal
The Shire Market	Mornington	No	defunct	1992–1993	
Shqiptari i Australisë	Footscray	No	defunct	2004–2005	Later known as Skanderbeg
Silver Living	Melbourne	Yes	defunct	1986	
Singles	West Melbourne	Yes	defunct	1985–1987	Previously known as Australian Singles News
S. Isaacson's National Times and Trade Review	Melbourne	Yes	defunct	1889	
The Situation	St Kilda	No	defunct	2013–2015	
Skanderbeg	Dandenong	No	defunct	2005–2006	Previously known as Shqiptari i Australisë
Skipton Standard and Streatham Gazette	Skipton	No	defunct	1914–1954	
The Sky Arrows	Melbourne	Yes	defunct	2003–2004	
Slobodni Dom	Fitzroy North	No	defunct	1970–1977	
Slovenski vestnik	North Altona	No	defunct	1956–1965	
Smith's Weekly	Melbourne	Yes	defunct	1968	
Snowy River Mail	Orbost	No	current	1911–	
The Snowy River Mail and Tambo and Croajingolong Gazette	Orbost	No	defunct	1890–1911	Later known as the Snowy River Mail
SN Weekly	Shepparton	No	defunct	2009–2013	
Soccer Week	Prahran	No	defunct	1974–1975	
Socialist	Melbourne	Yes	defunct	1906–1923	Later known as the Union Voice
The Socialist	Melbourne	Yes	defunct	1986–1994	Later known as the Socialist Worker (Sydney)
Socialist Action	Brunswick	No	defunct	1985–1990	Absorbed by the Socialist
Somerville News	Tyabb	No	defunct	2008–2010	Merged with the Hastings News to form the Western Port News
Sorrento News	Tyabb	No	defunct	2008–2010	Merged with Rosebud News and Rye News to form the Southern Peninsula News
Southbank Local News	Docklands	No	current	2011–	
Southern Advertiser	North Brighton	No	defunct	1959–1962	Later known as the Southern Cross (Central edition)
Southern Cross	Brighton	No	defunct	1871–1879	Later known as the Brighton Southern Cross
Southern Cross	Brighton	No	defunct	1936–1950	Later known as the Brighton Southern Cross
Southern Cross	Brighton	No	defunct	1955–1957	
Southern Cross	North Brighton	No	defunct	1959–1982	Merged with the Southern Cross (St Kilda ed) to form the Southern Cross (Southern/St Kilda ed)
Southern Cross, Bayside	Prahran	No	defunct	1996	Merged with the Southern Cross, Caulfield to form the Southern Cross, Caulfield/Bayside
Southern Cross, Brighton	Prahran	No	defunct	1996	Later known as the Southern Cross, Bayside
Southern Cross, Brighton, Hampton, Sandringham	Prahran	No	defunct	1994–1996	Later known as the Southern Cross, Brighton
Southern Cross, Caulfield	Prahran	No	defunct	1994–1997	Merged with the Southern Cross, Bayside to form the Southern Cross, Caulfield/Bayside
Southern Cross, Caulfield/Bayside	Carlton	No	defunct	1997	Splits into the Southern Cross, Caulfield/Bayside/Bentleigh (Brighton ed) and the Southern Cross, Caulfield/Bayside/Bentleigh (Caulfield ed)
Southern Cross, Caulfield/Bayside/Bentleigh (Brighton ed)	Carlton	No	defunct	1997–1998	Later known as the Bayside Southern Cross
Southern Cross, Caulfield/Bayside/Bentleigh (Caulfield ed)	Carlton	No	defunct	1997–1998	Later known as the Southern Cross, Caulfield/Bentleigh
Southern Cross, Caulfield/Bentleigh	Carlton	No	defunct	1998–1999	Later known as the Caulfield/Bentleigh Southern Cross
Southern Cross (Central ed)	Prahran	No	defunct	1983–1986	Later known as the Prahran and Malvern Southern Cross
Southern Cross (Central edition)	Toorak	No	defunct	1962–1978	Splits to form the Southern Cross (Prahran ed) and the Southern Cross (Malvern ed)
Southern Cross (Henty edition)	Brighton	No	defunct	1962–1965	Previously known as the Advertiser (Mulgrave and Oakleigh edition)
Southern Cross (Malvern ed)	Prahran	No	defunct	1978–1983	Merged with the Southern Cross (Prahran ed) to form the Southern Cross (Central ed)
Southern Cross, Malvern, Armadale	Prahran	No	defunct	1994	Merged with the Southern Cross, Prahran, Toorak, South Yarra to form the Southern Cross, Prahran, Toorak, Malvern
Southern Cross (Monash ed)	Brighton	No	defunct	1962–1965	Previously known as the Southern News
Southern Cross (Prahran ed)	Prahran	No	defunct	1978–1983	Other issue of the Southern Cross (Southern ed). Merged with the Southern Cross (Malvern ed) to form the Southern Cross (Central ed)
Southern Cross, Prahran/Malvern	Carlton	No	defunct	1997–1999	Previously known as the Southern Cross, Stonnington
Southern Cross, Prahran, Toorak, Malvern	Prahran	No	defunct	1994–1995	Later known as the Southern Cross, Stonnington
Southern Cross, Prahran, Toorak, South Yarra	Prahran	No	defunct	1994	Merged with the Southern Cross, Malvern, Armadale to form the Southern Cross, Prahran, Toorak, Malvern
Southern Cross (Southern/St Kilda ed)	Prahran	No	defunct	1982–1986	Later known as the Brighton Southern Cross
Southern Cross (St Kilda ed)	St Kilda	No	defunct	1978–1982	Merged with the Southern Cross (Southern ed) to form the Southern Cross (Southern/St Kilda ed)
Southern Cross, Stonnington	Prahran	No	defunct	1996	Later known as the Southern Cross, Prahran/Malvern
Southern Cross (Western ed)	Prahran	No	defunct	1971–1977	
The Southerner	Prahran	No	defunct	1978–1981	
Southern Flyer	Mornington	No	defunct	1993–1996	Later known as the Red Hill Flyer
Southern Mail	Korumburra	No	defunct	1890–1893	Later known as the Southern Mail and Korumburra Miners' Gazette
Southern Mail	Korumburra	No	defunct	1898–1909	Previously known as the Southern Mail and Korumburra Miners' Gazette
Southern Mail and Korumburra Miners' Gazette	Korumburra	No	defunct	1893–1898	Later known as the Southern Mail
Southern News	Malvern	No	defunct	1960–1962	Later known as the Southern Cross (Monash ed)
Southern Peninsula Gazette	Rosebud	No	defunct	1953–1995	Later merged with the Mornington Leader to form the Mornington Peninsula Leader
Southern Peninsula Local	Rosebud	No	defunct	1998–2001	Later known as Peninsula Local News
Southern Peninsula News	Tyabb	No	current	2010–	Previously known as Rosebud News, Rye News, and Sorrento News (merged)
Southern Progress	Glen Iris	No	defunct	1968–1969	Previously known as Chadstone Progress
Southern Sky	Albert Park	No	defunct	2001–2004	
Southern Star	Fitzroy	No	defunct	2008–2010	Later known as the Southern Star Observer
Southern Star Observer	Prahran	No	defunct	2010–2011	Later known as the Star Observer
Southern Torch News	Cheltenham	No	defunct	1956	Later known as the Clayton-Springvale-Noble Park Standard
Southern Weekly	Middle Brighton	No	defunct	1931–1937	
South Asia Times	Forest Hill	No	defunct	2011	
South Bourke and Mornington Journal	Richmond	No	defunct	1865–1927	Later known as the Dandenong Journal
South Bourke Standard	Hawthorn	No	defunct	1861–1873	
South Eastern Real Estate News	Pakenham	No	defunct	1992–2007	Later splits to form the South Eastern Star Real Estate (Pakenham ed), South Eastern Star Real Estate (Berwick, Narre Warren, and Beaconsfield ed), South Eastern Star Real Estate (Cranbourne and Hampton Park ed), and South Eastern Star Real Estate (Dandenong, Springvale, Noble Park, Hallam, Endeavour Hills, Doveton and Keysborough ed).
South Eastern Standard News Pictorial	Cheltenham	No	defunct	1960–1962	Merged with the Clayton Standard to form the Clayton-Springvale Standard
South Eastern Star Real Estate (Berwick, Narre Warren, and Beaconsfield ed)	Berwick	No	defunct	2007	Merged with the South Eastern Star Real Estate (Pakenham ed) to form the South Eastern Star Real Estate (Berwick, Pakenham, Narre Warren and Beaconsfield ed)
South Eastern Star Real Estate (Berwick, Pakenham, Narre Warren and Beaconsfield ed)	Pakenham	No	defunct	2007	Previously known as the South Eastern Star Real Estate (Pakenham ed) and South Eastern Star Real Estate (Berwick, Narre Warren, and Beaconsfield ed) (merged)
South Eastern Star Real Estate (Cranbourne and Hampton Park ed)	Pakenham	No	defunct	2007	Absorbed by the News, Cranbourne
South Eastern Star Real Estate (Dandenong, Springvale, Noble Park, Hallam, Endeavour Hills, Doveton and Keysborough ed)	Pakenham	No	defunct	2007	Absorbed by the Star, Greater Dandenong
South Eastern Star Real Estate (Pakenham ed)	Pakenham	No	defunct	2007	Merged with the South Eastern Star Real Estate (Berwick ed) to form the South Eastern Star Real Estate (Berwick, Pakenham, Narre Warren and Beaconsfield ed)
South East Suburban Mail	Oakleigh	No	defunct	1963–1964	Merged with the Standard (Springvale - Noble Park - Clayton ed), and the Clayton and District Times to form the Standard Times
South Gippsland Chronicle	Yarram	No	defunct	1921–1926	Previously known as the South Gippsland Chronicle and Yarram and Alberton Advertiser
South Gippsland Chronicle and Yarram and Alberton Advertiser	Yarram	No	defunct	1892–1920	Later known as the South Gippsland Chronicle
South Gippsland Express, Buln Buln, Narracan and Warragul Advertiser	Drouin	No	defunct	1884–1886	Later known as the South Gippsland Express, Warragul and Drouin Advertiser
South Gippsland Express, Warragul and Drouin Advertiser	Drouin	No	defunct	1887–1898	Later known as the West Gippsland Express, Buln Buln, Warragul, Berwick and Poowong and Jeetho Shires Advertiser
South Gippsland Sentinel Times	Korumburra	No	current	1973–	Previously known as the Wonthaggi Sentinel and the Times (Korumburra) (merged)
South Gippsland Shire Echo	Foster	No	defunct	1900–1918	
South Melbourne Advertiser	Albert Park	No	defunct	1895–1896	
South Melbourne Citizen	South Melbourne	Yes	defunct	1883–1894	
South Melbourne City News	South Melbourne	Yes	defunct	1991–1992	Previously known as Toorak Times (Melbourne City edition)
South Melbourne Star	South Melbourne	Yes	defunct	1900–1903	Previously known as the Courier : South Melbourne and St. Kilda Advertiser
South Metropolitan	Prahran	No	defunct	1906	
South-Port Voice	Richmond	No	defunct	1976–1977	
Spanish Weekly	Melbourne	Yes	defunct	1987	
The Spectator	Hamilton	No	defunct	1969–2024	Previously known as the Hamilton Spectator
Sport	Melbourne	Yes	defunct	1908–1909	Later known as Sport and Playgoer
Sport	Melbourne	Yes	defunct	1910–1917	Previously known as Sport and Playgoer
Sport and Playgoer	Melbourne	Yes	defunct	1909–10	Later known as Sport
The Sporting Don	Melbourne	Yes	defunct	1924	
Sporting Globe	Melbourne	Yes	defunct	1922–1988	Later splits to form the Midweek Sporting Globe, and the Weekend Sporting Globe
Sporting Judge	Melbourne	Yes	defunct	1892–1957	Later known as the Sporting Judge Form Guide
Sporting Judge Form Guide	St Kilda	No	defunct	1957–1965	Previously known as the Sporting Judge
Sporting Life and "The Bayonet"	Melbourne	Yes	defunct	1921–1922	Previously known as Bayonet
Sporting Magnet	North Carlton	No	defunct	1932–1933	Previously known as the Stipe
Sporting News	Bendigo	No	defunct	1901–1904	Later known as the Sporting News and Bendigo and Northern District Sport
Sporting News and Bendigo and Northern District Sport	Bendigo	No	defunct	1904–1915	Previously known as the Sporting News
Sporting Standard	Melbourne	Yes	defunct	1890–1893	Absorbed by the Sportsman
The Sporting Star	Geelong	No	defunct	1909–1911	
Sports Heartbalm	Melbourne	Yes	defunct	2000	Previously known as Heartbalm
Sportsman	Melbourne	Yes	defunct	1882–1904	Absorbed by the Sporting Judge
Sportsman's Review	Croydon	No	defunct	1989–1993	Previously known as Wilson's Sportsman's Review
Sports Mentor	Carlton	No	defunct	1946	
Sports Truth	Fitzroy	No	defunct	2002–2010	
Spotlight on Prahran	Hawthorn	No	defunct	1957–1958	
Spotlight on Yarra	Richmond	No	defunct	1956–1958	
S Press	Collingwood	No	defunct	2004–2007	Later known as Student
Spring Creek Advertiser and Rodney Standard	Spring Creek	No	defunct	1868–1869	
Springvale Clayton News	Melbourne	Yes	defunct	1968	Absorbed by the News, Dandenong
Springvale Dandenong Leader	Northcote	No	defunct	2001–2015	Merged with the Dandenong Leader to form the Greater Dandenong Leader
Springvale Dandenong Times	Cheltenham	No	defunct	1999–2001	Later known as the Springvale Dandenong Leader
The Sri Lankan	Richmond	No	defunct	1989–1992	
Srpska Borba	Melbourne	Yes	defunct	1971–1981	
Srpske novosti	Dandenong	No	defunct	1995	
Srpski Glas	Gladstone Park	No	defunct	1991–1996	Later known as Svetski Srpski Glas
Srpski Glas	Glenroy	No	defunct	2008–2023	Previously known as Svetski Srpski Glas
Standard	Frankston	No	defunct	1939–1949	Later known as the Frankston Standard
The Standard	Port Melbourne	No	defunct	1884–1914	Later known as the Port Melbourne Standard
The Standard and Ballarat Advertiser	Ballarat	No	defunct	1856	
The Standard : the Frankston, Mornington Peninsula News-Pictorial	Frankston	No	defunct	1957–1971	Later known as the Frankston Standard News Pictorial
Standard, and Port Phillip Gazetteer	Melbourne	Yes	defunct	1844–1845	Absorbed by the Port Phillip Patriot and Morning Advertiser
Standard Post-Weekender	Frankston	No	defunct	1978–1979	
Standard (Springvale - Noble Park - Clayton ed)	Springvale	No	defunct	1963–1964	Merged with the South East Suburban Mail, and the Clayton and District Times to form the Standard Times
The Standard	Warrnambool	No	current	1949–	Previously known as the Warrnambool Standard
Standard Times	Cheltenham	No	defunct	1984–1988	Later known as the Oakleigh Springvale Times
Standard Times	Oakleigh	No	defunct	1964–1977	Later known as the Oakleigh Standard Times
Standard Times, Clayton - Oakleigh - Springvale	Oakleigh	No	defunct	1978–1984	Later known as the Standard Times (Cheltenham)
The Star	Ballarat	No	defunct	1855–1864	Later known as the Ballarat Star
The Star	Leongatha	No	defunct	1934–1940	Later known as the Great Southern Star
The Star	Melbourne	Yes	defunct	1933–1936	
The Star	Moe	No	defunct	1946–1950	Absorbed by the Narracan Shire Advocate
Star, Dandenong	Pakenham	No	defunct	2005–2007	Merged with the Star, Springvale, Noble Park to form the Star, Greater Dandenong
Star, Footscray, Yarraville	Keilor East	No	defunct	2003–2004	Later known as the Star, Footscray, Yarraville, Braybrook
Star, Footscray, Yarraville, Braybrook	Tullamarine	No	defunct	2004–2014	Merged with the Star, Williamstown, Altona, Laverton and the Maribyrnong and Hobsons Bay Weekly to form the Maribyrnong and Hobsons Bay Star Weekly
The Star : Geelong Sports Review	Geelong	No	defunct	1955–1956	
Star, Greater Dandenong	Pakenham	No	defunct	2007–2013	Previously known as the Star, Springvale, Noble Park and the Star, Dandenong (merged)
Star, Hume : Our City	Tullamarine	No	defunct	2004–2012	Later known as Northern Star Property Plus
Star, Keilor, Taylors Lakes, Sydenham	Keilor East	No	defunct	2001–2014	Merged with the Brimbank and North West Weekly, and the Star, Sunshine, Ardeer, Albion, to form the Brimbank and North West Star Weekly
Star, Melton	Keilor Park	No	defunct	2012–2014	Merged with the Melton and Moorabool Weekly to form the Melton and Moorabool Star Weekly
Star News	Altona	No	defunct	1954–1955	Later known as the Altona Star
Star, Roxburgh Park, Craigieburn	Tullamarine	No	defunct	2004–2007	Later known as the Star, Hume : Our City
Star, St Albans, Deer Park, Caroline Springs	Keilor East	No	defunct	2001–2014	
Star, South Morang, Mill Park, Bundoora	Tullamarine	No	defunct	2004–2007	Merged with the Star, Thomastown, Epping, Lalor to form the Star, Whittlesea Our City
Star, Springvale, Noble Park	Pakenham	No	defunct	2005–2007	Merged with the Star, Dandenong to form the Star, Greater Dandenong
Star, Sunshine, Ardeer, Albion	Tullamarine	No	defunct	2004–2014	Merged with the Brimbank and North West Weekly and the Star, Keilor, Taylors Lakes, Sydenham to form the Brimbank and North West Star Weekly
Star, Sunshine, Ardeer, Braybrook	Keilor East	No	defunct	2001–2004	Later known as the Star, Sunshine, Ardeer,
Star, Thomastown, Epping, Lalor	Tullamarine	No	defunct	2004–2007	Merged with the Star, South Morang, Mill Park, Bundoora to form Star, Whittlesea Our City
Star, Wallan, Kilmore, Broadford	Tullamarine	No	defunct	2008–2012	Later known as Northern Star Property Plus
Star, Werribee, Hoppers Crossing	Keilor East	No	defunct	2003–2008	Later known as the Star, Werribee, Hoppers Crossing, Point Cook
Star, Werribee, Hoppers Crossing, Point Cook	Tullamarine	No	defunct	2008–2014	Merged with the Wyndham Weekly to form the Wyndham Star Weekly
Star, Whittlesea, Mernda, Doreen	Tullamarine	No	defunct	2008–2012	Later known as Northern Star Property Plus
Star, Whittlesea, Wallan, Kilmore	Tullamarine	No	defunct	2004–2008	Later known as the Star, Wallan, Kilmore, Broadford
Star, Whittlesea Our City	Tullamarine	No	defunct	2007–2008	Later known as the Star, Whittlesea, Mernda, Doreen
Star, Williamstown, Altona, Laverton	Keilor East	No	defunct	2003–2014	Merged with the Star, Footscray, Yarraville, Braybrook and the Maribyrnong and Hobsons Bay Weekly to form the Maribyrnong and Hobsons Bay Star Weekly
Stawell Chronicle and Wimmera News	Stawell	No	defunct	1877–1879	Merged with the Pleasant Creek News and Wimmera Advertiser to form the Pleasant Creek News and Stawell Chronicle
Stawell News and Pleasant Creek Chronicle	Stawell	No	defunct	1895–1961	Merged with the Stawell Times to form the Stawell Times-News
Stawell Times	Stawell	No	defunct	1950–1961	Merged with the Stawell News and Pleasant Creek Chronicle to form the Stawell Times-News
Stawell Times-News	Stawell	No	current	1962–	Previously known as the Stawell Times, and the Stawell News and Pleasant Creek Chronicle (merged)
Stawell Times and Wimmera Advertiser	Stawell	No	defunct	1888–1950	Later known as the Stawell Times
Steiglitz Guardian	Geelong	No	defunct	1865	Later known as the Geelong Chronicle and Steiglitz Guardian
Steiglitz Miner, and Meredith Shire Advertiser	Steiglitz	No	defunct	1893–1907	Later known as the Meredith Sentinel and Bamganie Goldfields Chronicle
The Stipe	North Carlton	No	defunct	1931–1932	Later known as the Sporting Magnet
Stock and Land	Melbourne	Yes	current	1914–	
Stonnington Leader	Hawthorn	No	defunct	2000–2020	Previously known as the Malvern-Prahran Leader
Stonnington Review Local	Docklands	No	defunct	2012–2013	Previously known as the Melbourne Weekly Magazine
Stratford Progress	Maffra	No	defunct	1925–1939	
Stratford Sentinel and Briagolong Express	Stratford	No	defunct	1911–1916	
Stratford Town Crier	Stratford	No	current	2006–	
Student	Port Melbourne	No	defunct	2007–2008	Later known as Spress
Student Autonomy Under Attack	Carlton	No	defunct	1977–1978	
Sun	Ballarat	No	defunct	1864–1865	Later known as the Ballarat Sun and Mining Journal
The Sun	Clifton Hill	No	defunct	1888–1903	Merged with the Arena to form the Arena-Sun
The Sun	Koo Wee Rup	No	defunct	1972–1982	Absorbed by the Cranbourne Sun
The Sun, Corowa-Rutherglen	Rutherglen	No	defunct	1979	Previously known as the Rutherglen Sun and Chiltern Valley Advertiser
Sun News-Pictorial	Melbourne	Yes	defunct	1922–1990	Later merged with the Herald Sun to form the Herald Sun News-Pictorial
The Sun News-Pictorial Weekly Digest	Melbourne	Yes	defunct	1937	
Sunbury Leader	Sunbury	No	defunct	2001–2020	Previously known as the Sunbury Regional
Sunbury and Macedon Ranges Star Weekly	Melton	No	current	2014–	Previously known as the Sunbury and Macedon Ranges Weekly
Sunbury and Macedon Ranges Weekly	Melton	No	defunct	2012–2014	Previously known as the Sunbury Weekly, and the Macedon Ranges Weekly (merged)
Sunbury News	Sunbury	No	defunct	1892	Later known as the Sunbury News and Bulla and Melton Advertiser
Sunbury News	Sunbury	No	defunct	1900–1965	Later merged with the Romsey Examiner, the Gisborne Gazette, and the Lancefield Mercury and West Bourke Agricultural Record to form the Mount Macedon and Districts Regional News-Gazette
Sunbury News	Sunbury	No	defunct	1978–1979	Merged with the Melton Mirror and the Gisborne Gazette to form the Sunbury Regional News
Sunbury News and Bulla and Melton Advertiser	Sunbury	No	defunct	1892–1900	Later known as the Sunbury News
Sunbury Regional	Sunbury	No	defunct	1994–2001	Later known as the Sunbury Leader
Sunbury Regional News	Sunbury	No	defunct	1979–1980	Later known as the Regional News (Sunbury)
Sunbury Sun	Sunbury	No	defunct	1978–1980	Later known as the Sunbury Telegraph
Sunbury Telegraph	Gisborne	No	defunct	1980–1981	Merged with the Gisborne and Macedon Telegraph and the Woodend Telegraph to form the Macedon Ranges Telegraph
Sunbury Telegraph	Gisborne	No	defunct	1996–2010	Previously known as the Telegraph (Sunbury ed)
Sunbury Weekly	Gisborne	No	defunct	2010–2012	Merged with the Macedon Ranges Weekly to form the Sunbury and Macedon Ranges Weekly
Sunday Herald	Melbourne	Yes	defunct	1989–1991	Sunday edition of The Herald. Merged with the Sunday Sun News-Pictorial to form the Sunday Herald-Sun
Sunday Herald-Sun	Melbourne	Yes	defunct	1991–1995	Later known as the Herald Sun (Sunday)
Sunday Mirror	Collingwood	No	defunct	1983	
Sunday News	South Melbourne	Yes	defunct	1971	
Sunday News Melbourne	Ashburton	No	defunct	2006–2010	Later known as Korean Today
Sunday Observer	Melbourne	Yes	defunct	1973–1989	Previously known as the Melbourne Observer
Sunday Observer	Fishermen's Bend	No	defunct	1969–1971	Absorbed by the Sunday Review
Sunday Post	Melbourne	Yes	defunct	1969	
Sunday Press	Melbourne	Yes	defunct	1974–1989	Previously known as the Melbourne Sunday Press
Sunday Review	Fishermen's Bend	No	defunct	1970–1971	Later known as the Review (Fishermen's Bend)
Sunday Star	Pascoe Vale	No	defunct	1957	
Sunday Sun News-Pictorial	Melbourne	Yes	defunct	1989–1991	Sunday edition of the Sun News-Pictorial. Merged with the Sunday Sun News-Pictorial to form the Sunday Herald-Sun
Sunraysia Daily	Mildura	No	current	1920–	Previously known as the Mildura Cultivator, the Mildura Telegraph and Darling and Lower Murray Advocate, and the Merbein Irrigationist and Murray Valley Soldiers' Gazette (merged)
Sunraysia Life	Mildura	No	defunct	2018–2020	Previously known as Mildura Midweek
Sunshine Advocate	Sunshine	No	defunct	1924–1969	Later known as the Sunshine-St Albans-Melton Advocate
Sunshine Mail	Melbourne	Yes	defunct	1976–1978	
Sunshine-St Albans-Melton Advocate	Sunshine	No	defunct	1969–1974	Later known as the Sunshine Western-Suburbs Advocate
Sunshine-Western Suburbs Advocate	Noble Park	No	defunct	1974–1995	Later known as the St Albans/Keilor Advocate
Suomi = Finland	Carnegie	No	defunct	1926–2024	
Surf Coast Echo	Geelong	No	defunct	2002–2013	Merged with the Bellarine Echo and the Ocean Grove Echo to become the Echo (Geelong)
Surf Coast Independent	Geelong	No	defunct	2011–2014	Previously known as the Torquay, Jan Juc Independent
Surf Coast Times	Torquay	No	current	2009–	
Svetski Srpski Glas	Glenroy	No	defunct	1996–2008	Later known as Srpski Glas
Swag	Warrnambool	No	defunct	1979–1980	
Swanhill Guardian and North Western Irrigationist	Swan Hill	No	defunct	1888–1892	Later known as the Swan Hill Guardian and Lake Boga Advocate
Swan Hill Guardian	Swan Hill	No	defunct	1938–1971	Later known as the Guardian (Swan Hill)
Swan Hill Guardian and Lake Boga Advocate	Swan Hill	No	defunct	1892–1937	Later known as the Swan Hill Guardian

== T ==
Newspaper	Town / suburb	Melbourne region	Status	Years of publication	Notes
Tab	Melbourne	Yes	defunct	1965	
Tabform	Melbourne	Yes	defunct	1973–1974	
Table Talk	Melbourne	Yes	defunct	1885–1939	
Talbot Leader	Talbot	No	defunct	1863–1948	Later merged with the Clunes Guardian and Gazette to form the Clunes-Talbot Guardian
Talbot Leader and North Western Chronicle	Talbot	No	defunct	1861–1863	Later known as the Talbot Leader
Tambo and Orbost Times and Haunted Stream and Buchan News	Bruthen	No	defunct	1887–1903	Later known as the Bruthen and Tambo Times
Tamil World	Preston South	No	defunct	1993	
Ta Nea	East Preston	No	defunct	1961–1968	
Ta Nea	West Melbourne	Yes	current	1995–	
Taradale Express and Metcalfeshire Mercury	Warrnambool	No	defunct	1872–1882	Later known as the Metcalfe Shire News and Taradale and Malmsbury Mining Record
Tarnagulla Courier and General Advertiser for Newbridge, Eddington, Moliagul and Laanecoorie	Tarnagulla	No	defunct	1864–1869	Later known as the Tarnagulla and Llanelly Courier and General Advertiser for the Mandurang, Avoca and Loddon Districts
Tarnagulla and Llanelly Courier	Tarnagulla	No	defunct	1918	Later known as the Loddon Valley Courier and Farmer's Advocate
Tarnagulla and Llanelly Courier and General Advertiser for the Mandurang, Avoca and Loddon Districts	Tarnagulla	No	defunct	1869–1918	Later known as the Tarnagulla and Llanelly Courier
Tarrangower Times	Maldon	No	current	1979–	Previously known as the Maldon Times
Tarrangower Times	Maldon	No	defunct	1972–1974	Later known as the Maldon Times
Tarrangower Times and Maldon Advertiser	Maldon	No	defunct	1894–1951	Later known as the Maldon Times
Tarrangower Times and Maldon District Advertiser	Maldon	No	defunct	1858–1862	Later known as the Tarrangower Times and Maldon and Newstead Advertiser
Tarrangower Times and Maldon and Newstead Advertiser	Maldon	No	defunct	1862–1873	Later known as the Tarrangower Times and Maldon, Newstead, Baringhup, Laancoorie, and Muckleford Advertiser
Tarrangower Times and Maldon, Newstead, Baringhup, Laancoorie, and Muckleford Advertiser	Maldon	No	defunct	1873–1894	Later known as the Tarrangower Times and Maldon Advertiser
Tatura Free Press and Rodney and Deakin Shire Advocate	Kyabram	No	defunct	1900–1938	Merged with the Tatura Guardian to form the Tatura Guardian Press
Tatura Guardian	Tatura	No	defunct	1894–1938	Merged with the Tatura Free Press and Rodney and Deakin Shire Advocate to form the Tatura Guardian Press
Tatura Guardian	Tatura	No	defunct	1968–2019	Previously known as the Tatura Guardian Press
Tatura Guardian Press	Kyabram	No	defunct	1939–1968	Later known as the Tatura Guardian
Tatura Herald and Rodneyshire Advocate	Tatura	No	defunct	1886–1895	Absorbed by the Tatura Guardian
Tatura Herald and Warangashire Advocate	Tatura	No	defunct	1880–1886	Later known as the Tatura Herald and Rodneyshire Advocate
Tatura Independent and Kyabram Free Press	Tatura	No	defunct	1884	
The Telegraph	Gisborne	No	defunct	1989–1990	Merged with the Telegraph (Melton) to form Telegraph (Bacchus Marsh-Melton edition)
The Telegraph	Gisborne	No	defunct	1989–1996	Splits to form the Telegraph (Macedon Ranges ed) and the Telegraph (Sunbury ed)
The Telegraph (Bacchus Marsh edition)	Gisborne	No	defunct	1995–1996	Merged with the Melton-Bacchus Marsh Express to become the Bacchus Marsh Express
The Telegraph (Bacchus Marsh-Melton Edition)	Gisborne	No	defunct	1990–1995	Later splits to form the Bacchus Marsh Telegraph and the Melton Telegraph
The Telegraph	Kyneton	No	defunct	1989–1990	Absorbed by the Telegraph (Gisborne)
The Telegraph	Melton	No	defunct	1989–1990	Merged with the Telegraph (Bacchus Marsh) to form Telegraph (Bacchus Marsh-Melton edition)
The Telegraph (Macedon Ranges ed)	Gisborne	No	defunct	1995–1996	Later known as the Macedon Ranges Telegraph
The Telegraph	Seymour	No	current	2014–	Previously known as the Seymour Telegraph
The Telegraph	Sunbury	No	defunct	1989–1990	Absorbed by the Telegraph (Gisborne)
The Telegraph, St. Kilda, Prahran and South Yarra Guardian	Prahran	No	defunct	1862–1888	Later known as the Prahran Telegraph
The Telegraph (Sunbury ed)	Gisborne	No	defunct	1995–1996	Later known as the Sunbury Telegraph
Tell It To The Marines	Box Hill	No	defunct	1985–1986	Later known as Fandango
Terang Express and Hampden and Mortlake Advertiser	Camperdown	No	current	1888–	
Teviskes Aidai	South Melbourne	Yes	defunct	1956–2023	
The Theatrical Courier	Melbourne	Yes	defunct	1887–1889	Later known as The Lorgnette: a Journal of Amusements
T.H. Moyle's Australian Farmers' and Graziers' Journal	Melbourne	Yes	defunct	1889	
Thomas Geddes' Centennial News and Farmers' Review	Melbourne	Yes	defunct	1889	
Thomas Nayler's Australian Record and Weekly Review	Melbourne	Yes	defunct	1889	
Tian An Men Times	South Melbourne	Yes	current	2009–	
The Tide Chinese Newspaper (Aozhou hai chao bao)	Springvale	No	defunct	1989	Later known as Aozhou xin hai chao bao (The Tide Chinese Newspaper)
The Tide Chinese Newspaper (Aozhou hai chao yue bao)	Springvale	No	defunct	1988–1989	Later known as Aozhou hai chao bao (The Tide Chinese Newspaper)
The Tide Chinese Newspaper (Aozhou xin hai chao bao)	Springvale	No	defunct	1990–1995	Later known as Xin hai chao bao (The Tide Chinese Newspaper)
The Tide Chinese Newspaper (Xin hai chao bao)	Melbourne	Yes	defunct	1995–2006	Previously known as Aozhou xin hai chao bao (The Tide Chinese Newspaper)
Tiger Rag	Prahran	No	defunct	1980–1982	
Time-Out	North Melbourne	Yes	defunct	1975–1976	
Times	Ballarat	No	defunct	1859–1861	Previously known as the Ballarat Times
The Times	Belmont	No	defunct	1940–1962	Previously known as the West Citizen
The Times	Carlton	No	defunct	1939–1948	Later known as the Carlton Times
The Times	Clifton Hill	No	defunct	1938–1939	Previously known as the Clifton Hill Times
The Times	Dandenong	No	defunct	1934–1936	Later known as the Dandenong Advertiser and Cranbourne, Berwick and Oakleigh Advocate
The Times	Dandenong	No	defunct	1977–1979	Later known as the Berwick-Pakenham Times
The Times	Melbourne	Yes	defunct	1851	Previously known as the Port Phillip Gazette
The Times	Melbourne	Yes	defunct	1884–1886	
The Times	Prahran	No	defunct	1957–1968	Previously known as the Malvern Advertiser
The Times	St Kilda	No	defunct	1888–1889	Previously known as the St Kilda Times
The Times	Trafalgar	No	defunct	1942–1957	Absorbed by the Latrobe Valley Advocate
The Times	Korumburra	No	defunct	1957–1973	Merged with the Wonthaggi Sentinel to form the South Gippsland Sentinel Times
Times of Malta	Brunswick	No	defunct	1981–1988	Previously known as Times of Malta and Australia
Times of Malta and Australia	Brunswick	No	defunct	1967–1981	Later known as Times of Malta
Times Weekender	Sale	No	defunct	1985–1989	Later known as the Gippsland Times
Times Weekly	Geelong	No	defunct	1918–1923	Previously known as the Geelong Times (Weekly edition)
Tocsin	Melbourne	Yes	defunct	1897–1906	Later known as Labor Call
Today	Melbourne	Yes	defunct	1894	
Today	Thomastown	No	defunct	1992–2010	Later known as the Australian Macedonian Today
Tongala Times and Deakin Shire News	Tongala	No	defunct	1930–1931	
Toolamba Telegraph and Mooroopna, Shepparton, Arcadia and Murchison Advertiser	Toolamba	No	defunct	1874–1875	Later known as the Mooroopna and Toolamba Telegraph
Toorak Metropolitan News	St Kilda	No	defunct	2004–2005	Later known as the Metro News
Toorak, South Yarra, Prahran Southern Cross	Prahran	No	defunct	1988–1991	Later known as the Prahran, Toorak, South Yarra Southern Cross
Toorak Sunday Times	Toorak	No	defunct	1984–1993	
Toorak Times	Mentone	No	defunct	1972–1992	
Toorak Times (Brighton edition)	Melbourne	Yes	defunct	1973	Later known as the Brighton edition of the Toorak Times
Toorak Times (Frankston and Peninsula ed)	Prahran	No	defunct	1981	
Toorak Times (Melbourne City edition)	Melbourne	Yes	defunct	1986–1991	Splits to form Carlton Fitzroy City News, Collingwood City News, Melbourne City News, Richmond City News, and South Melbourne City News
Toora and Welshpool Ensign	Foster	No	defunct	1964–1974	Merged with the Foster Mirror to form The Mirror
Toora and Welshpool Ensign and South Gippsland Shire Observer	Toora	No	defunct	1909–1947	Later known as The Ensign (Toora)
Toora and Welshpool Pioneer	Toora	No	defunct	1892	Later known as the Toora and Welshpool Pioneer and Foster and Agnes River News
Toora and Welshpool Pioneer and Agnes River News	Toora	No	defunct	1894–1903	Absorbed by the Toora and Welshpool Ensign and South Gippsland Shire Observer
Toora and Welshpool Pioneer and Foster and Agnes River News	Toora	No	defunct	1892–1894	Later known as the Toora and Welshpool Pioneer and Agnes River News
Torch	South Melbourne	Yes	defunct	1971–1972	
Torquay, Jan Juc Independent	Geelong	No	defunct	2008–2010	Later known as the Surf Coast Independent
Total Real Estate News	Dandenong	No	defunct	1978	
Town and Country	Melbourne	Yes	defunct	1872–1875	Absorbed by the Weekly Times
Town Crier	Cheltenham	No	defunct	1976–1986	
Town Talk	Melbourne	Yes	defunct	1881–1882	
Trader	Emerald	No	defunct	1981–1989	Later known as the Hills Trader
The Trades' Hall Gazette : and literary journal	Carlton	No	defunct	1888–1889	Later known as the Australian Trades and Labour Journal
Trafalgar News	Warragul	No	defunct	1965–1988	Previously known as the Gippsland News
Trafalgar and Yarragon News	Trafalgar	No	defunct	1922–1931	Later known as the Trafalgar, Yarragon and Yallourn News
Trafalgar and Yarragon Times	Trafalgar	No	defunct	1902–1942	Later known as the Times (Trafalgar)
Trafalgar, Yarragon and Yallourn News	Trafalgar	No	defunct	1931–1937	Later known as the Gippsland News
Traralgon Journal	Traralgon	No	defunct	1978–2011	Previously known as the Traralgon Journal and Record
Traralgon Journal and Record	Traralgon	No	defunct	1962–1971	Later known as the Traralgon Journal
Traralgon Record	Traralgon	No	defunct	1886–1932	Absorbed by The Journal (Traralgon)
Traralgon Record and Morwell, Mirboo, Toongabbie, Heyfield, Tyers and Callignee Advertiser	Traralgon	No	defunct	1883–1886	Later known as the Traralgon Record
Trentham Advertiser	Daylesford	No	defunct	1891–1892	Absorbed by the Daylesford Advocate and Hepburn, Glenlyon, and Blanket Flat Chronicle
Trentham Gazette	Daylesford	No	defunct	1936–1960	
Tribune	Ballarat	No	defunct	1861–1863	
Tribune	Clifton Hill	No	defunct	1894–1906	
The Tribune	Melbourne	Yes	defunct	1900–1971	
The Trotter	Northcote	No	defunct	1945–1949	
Truth	Melbourne	Yes	defunct	1884	Later known as the Melbourne Truth
Truth	Prahran	No	defunct	1891–1892	
Truth	Melbourne	Yes	defunct	1902–1974	Later known as the Truth (Midweek ed)
Truth	Melbourne	Yes	defunct	1993–1994	Later splits to form the Truth Sport, and the World
Truth	Melbourne	Yes	defunct	1999–2000	Later known as Heartbalm
Truth (Midweek ed)	Melbourne	Yes	defunct	1974–1993	Merged with the Truth (Weekend ed) to form the Truth
Truth (Weekend ed)	Melbourne	Yes	defunct	1974–1993	Merged with the Truth (Midweek ed) to form the Truth
Truth National	West Melbourne	Yes	defunct	1996–1999	Later known as the Truth
Truth Racing	West Melbourne	Yes	defunct	1996–1997	Previously known as the Truth Sport
Truth Sport	Melbourne	Yes	defunct	1994–1996	Later splits to form the Truth Racing and the Truth National
Tsachpina	North Clayton	No	defunct	1990–2003	
T͡Serkva i z͡hytti͡a	Melbourne	Yes	defunct	1960–2023	
T.T.'s Melbourne City	Melbourne	Yes	defunct	1985–1986	Later known as Toorak Times (Melbourne City edition)
Tungamah Independent	Tungamah	No	defunct	1938–1960	Previously known as the Moira Independent
Tungamah and Lake Rowan Express	Tungamah	No	defunct	1882–1883	Later known as the Tungamah and Lake Rowan Express and St James Gazette
Tungamah and Lake Rowan Express and St James Gazette	Tungamah	No	defunct	1883–1927	Later merged with the Yarrawonga Mercury and Southern Riverina Advertiser to form the Yarrawonga Mercury and Tungamah and Lake Rowan Express and St James Gazette
Turkish Gazette	Glenroy	No	defunct	1986–1987	
Turkish News	Moonee Ponds	No	defunct	1970–1990	
Turkish Report and Australian News	Moreland	No	defunct	1995–2000	Later known as the Turkish Report Weekly
Turkish Report Weekly	Moreland	No	defunct	2000–2017	Previously known as the Turkish Report and Australian News
Turkish Weekly Gazette	Melbourne	Yes	defunct	1991–1994	
Twenty-first century Chinese newspaper	Melbourne	Yes	defunct	2000–2018	
Two Worlds: a Weekly Supplement to the Maryborough Advertiser	Maryborough	No	defunct	1876–1878	Supplement to the Maryborough Advertiser

== U ==
Newspaper	Town / suburb	Melbourne region	Status	Years of publication	Notes
Ukraïnet͡sʹ v Avstraliï	Coburg	No	defunct	1956–1984	
Ultima and Chillingollah Star	Ultima	No	defunct	1913–1951	Later absorbed by the Quambatook Times
Ultima Star and Chillingollah express	Ultima	No	defunct	1910–1913	Later known as the Ultima and Chillingollah Star
Umag	Hawthorn	No	defunct	2001–2003	After 2003 included as part of the Progress Leader
Underbool Mirror	Ouyen	No	defunct	1925–1957	Later absorbed by the North West Express
Union Voice	Melbourne	Yes	defunct	1924–1932	Previously known as the Socialist
Unity	Rosanna	No	defunct	1999–2000	
Upper Murray Herald	Tallangatta	No	defunct	1885	Later known as the Upper Murray and Mitta Herald
Upper Murray and Mitta Herald	Tallangatta	No	defunct	1886–1974	Previously known as the Upper Murray Herald
Upper Yarra Advocate	Lilydale	No	defunct	1912–1929	Later known as the Warburton Mail
Upper Yarra Guardian Mail	Yarra Junction	No	defunct	1997–1999	Later known as the Upper Yarra Mail
Upper Yarra Mail	Yarra Junction	No	defunct	1987–1995	Later known as the Yarra Valley Guardian Mail
Upper Yarra Mail	Yarra Junction	No	defunct	1999–2020	Later known as the Upper Yarra Star Mail
Upper Yarra Star Mail	Healesville	No	current	2020–	Previously known as the Upper Yarra Mail
Uthayam	Wheelers Hill	No	defunct	1997–2010	
U : the magazine for you.	Blackburn	No	defunct	1999–2001	Later known as Umag

== V ==
Newspaper	Town / suburb	Melbourne region	Status	Years of publication	Notes
Vagabond	Melbourne	Yes	defunct	1884	Later known as the Truth
Valley Voice	Eltham	No	defunct	1978–1979	
Valley Weekly	Dandenong	No	defunct	2005–2006	Merged with the Heidelberg Weekly to form the Heidelberg and Valley Weekly
Vanguard	Melbourne	Yes	defunct	1917	
Vanity Fair	Melbourne	Yes	defunct	1903–1905	
Vibe	Collingwood	No	defunct	2000	Previously known as Vibe National
Vibe National	Mill Park	No	defunct	1999–2000	Later known as Vibe
VICE, Victorian inter campus edition	Melbourne	Yes	defunct	1994–1997	Previously known as ICE, inter campus edition
Victoria Advocate and People's Vindicator	Geelong	No	defunct	1851	
Victoria Colonist, and Western District Advertiser	Geelong	No	defunct	1849	Previously known as the Corio Chronicle, and Western District Advertiser
Victoria Courier and Working Man's Advocate	Geelong	No	defunct	1848–1849	
Victoria Deutsche presse	Melbourne	Yes	defunct	1859–1860	
Victoria Times	Castlemaine	No	defunct	1854	
Victoriai Magyarság	Melbourne	Yes	defunct	1963–1964	Later known as Ausztráliai Magyarság
The Victorian	Melbourne	Yes	defunct	1862–1864	
Victorian Banner : a weekly journal of religion and politics	Melbourne	Yes	defunct	1882–1884	
Victorian Dairyfarmer	Melbourne	Yes	defunct	1946–1976	
Victorian Farmer	Mulgrave	No	defunct	1981–1983	Later known as the VFGA Newsletter
Victorian Farmer : official organ of the Victorian Farmers' Union	Melbourne	Yes	defunct	1968–1980	Later known as the Farmer
Victorian Farmers' Gazette	Shepparton	No	defunct	1887–1890	
Victorian Farmers' Journal and Gardener's Chronicle	Melbourne	Yes	defunct	1860–1862	Later known as the Farmer's Journal and Gardener's Chronicle
Victorian Freemason	Melbourne	Yes	defunct	1883–1890	
Victorian Greyhound Weekly	Melbourne	Yes	defunct	1973–1993	Later known as the National Greyhound Weekly
Victorian Homemaker's Guide	Melbourne	Yes	defunct	1986–1987	Absorbed by the Coburg Brunswick Northerner
Victorian Speedway News	St Kilda	No	defunct	1973–1978	
Victorian Trotting Record	South Melbourne	Yes	defunct	1906–1913	Later known as the Australian Trotting Record
Victorian Wheatgrower : the official organ of the Victorian Wheat and Woolgrowers Association	Melbourne	Yes	defunct	1937–1953	Later known as the Victorian Wool and Wheatgrower : official organ of the Victorian Wheat and Woolgrowers' Association
Victorian Wheat and Woolgrower : official organ of the Victorian Wheat and Woolgrowers' Association	Melbourne	Yes	defunct	1956–1968	Merged with the Australian Producer to form the Victorian Farmer
Victorian Wool and Wheatgrower : official organ of the Victorian Wheat and Woolgrowers' Association	Melbourne	Yes	defunct	1954–1956	Later known as the Victorian Wheat and Woolgrower : official organ of the Victorian Wheat and Woolgrowers' Association.
Việt Nam ngày mai	Essendon	No	defunct	1980–1983	Later known as Ngày mai
Vietnews	Footscray	No	defunct	2015–2024	
Viet Times	Dandenong North	No	current	1997–	
Violet Town Herald	Euroa	No	defunct	1884–1895	Absorbed by the Euroa Advertiser
Violet Town Sentinel	Violet Town	No	defunct	1894–1957	Absorbed by the Euroa Gazette
Vision China Times	Melbourne	Yes	current	2015–	
Voce d'Italia	Abbotsford	No	defunct	1961–1962	
Voce d'Italia	Melbourne	Yes	defunct	1919–1920	
Voce d'Italia	St Kilda	No	defunct	1969	
The Voice	Richmond	No	defunct	1989	
Voice of Malta	Prahran	No	defunct	1956–1987	
Voice on Pako	Ocean Grove	No	defunct	2014–2020	

== W ==
Newspaper	Town / suburb	Melbourne region	Status	Years of publication	Notes
Wahgunyah and Rutherglen News	Wahgunyah	No	defunct	1875–1894	Later known as the Rutherglen and Wahgunyah News
Walhalla Chronicle and Gippsland Mining Journal	Walhalla	No	defunct	1869–1888	Later known as the Walhalla Chronicle : Moondarra, Toombom and Wood's Point Times
Walhalla Chronicle and Moondarra Advertiser	Walhalla	No	defunct	1914–1915	Previously known as the Walhalla Chronicle : Moondarra, Toombom and Wood's Point Times
Walhalla Chronicle : Moondarra, Toombom and Wood's Point Times	Walhalla	No	defunct	1888–1914	Later known as the Walhalla Chronicle and Moondarra Advertiser
Wangaratta Bi-Weekly Dispatch and North-Eastern Advertiser	Wangaratta	No	defunct	1882–1907	Later known as the Wangaratta Dispatch and North-Eastern Advertiser
Wangaratta Chronicle	Wangaratta	No	defunct	1884–1937	Later merged with the Wangaratta Despatch to form the Wangaratta Chronicle-Despatch
Wangaratta Chronicle	Wangaratta	No	current	2003–	Previously known as the Chronicle (Wangaratta)
Wangaratta Chronicle-Despatch	Wangaratta	No	defunct	1937–1959	Later known as the Chronicle Despatch
Wangaratta Despatch	Wangaratta	No	defunct	1921–1937	Merged with the Wangaratta Chronicle to form the Wangaratta Chronicle-Despatch
Wangaratta Dispatch and North-Eastern Advertiser	Wangaratta	No	defunct	1875–1877	Later known as the Wangaratta Bi-Weekly Dispatch and North-Eastern Advertiser
Wangaratta and North East Advertiser	Wangaratta	No	defunct	1989–1995	Later known as the North East Advertiser
Waranga Chronicle and Goulburn Advertiser	Rushworth	No	defunct	1869–1886	Later known as the Rushworth Chronicle and Goulburn Advertiser
Waranga Echo and General Advertiser	Rushworth	No	defunct	1868–1869	
Warburton Mail	Warburton	No	defunct	1927–1966	Later merged with the Healesville Review to form the Yarra Valley News
War Cry	Melbourne	Yes	defunct	1891–2020	Later known as On Fire: Mission and Ministry and the Salvos Magazine
The War Cry for the Colony of Victoria	Melbourne	Yes	defunct	1885–1889	Later known as The War Cry and the Official Gazette of the Salvation Army
The War Cry and the Official Gazette of the Salvation Army	Melbourne	Yes	defunct	1889–1891	Later known as War Cry
The War Cry and the Official Gazette of the Salvation Army, Victoria	Melbourne	Yes	defunct	1883–1885	Later known as The War Cry for the Colony of Victoria
Warracknabeal Herald	Warracknabeal	No	current	1902–	Previously known as the Warracknabeal Herald and Wimmera District Advocate
Warracknabeal Herald and Wimmera District Advocate	Warracknabeal	No	defunct	1885–1902	Later known as the Warracknabeal Herald
Warragul and Baw Baw Citizen	Warragul	No	defunct	2014–2015	Later known as the Baw Baw Citizen
Warragul Gazette	Warragul	No	defunct	1931–1959	Later known as the Gazette, Warragul
Warragul Guardian	Warragul	No	defunct	1895–1960	Later known as the New Guardian
Warragul Guardian and Buln Buln and Narracan Shire Advocate	Warragul	No	defunct	1879–1894	Later known as the Warragul Guardian and West Gippsland Advertiser
Warragul Guardian and West Gippsland Advertiser	Warragul	No	defunct	1894	Merged with the Warragul News and Gippsland Representative to form the Warragul Guardian
Warragul News and Gippsland Representative	Warragul	No	defunct	1893–1894	Merged with the Warragul Guardian and West Gippsland Advertiser to form the Warragul Guardian
Warragul News and South Gippsland Representative	Warragul	No	defunct	1887–1893	Later known as the Warragul News and Gippsland Representative
Warrnambool Advertiser and Villiers, Heytesbury and Hampden General Reporter	Warrnambool	No	defunct	1868–1873	Previously known as the Warrnambool Sentinel and Villiers and Heytesbury Messenger
Warrnambool Examiner	Warrnambool	No	defunct	1880	Absorbed by the Warrnambool Standard
Warrnambool Examiner and Western District Advertiser	Warrnambool	No	defunct	1849–1878	Absorbed by the Warrnambool Guardian and Examiner
Warrnambool Extra	Warrnambool	No	defunct	2007–2013	
Warrnambool Guardian	Warrnambool	No	defunct	1878	Later known as the Warrnambool Guardian and "Examiner"
Warrnambool Guardian and "Examiner"	Warrnambool	No	defunct	1878–1879	Later known as the Warrnambool Examiner
Warrnambool Guardian and Western Province Advertiser	Warrnambool	No	defunct	1874–1878	Later known as the Warrnambool Guardian and Examiner
Warrnambool Sentinel and Villiers and Heytesbury Messenger	Warrnambool	No	defunct	1861–1868	Later known as the Warrnambool Advertiser and Villiers, Heytesbury and Hampden General Reporter
Warrnambool Standard	Warrnambool	No	defunct	1872–1949	Later known as the Standard (Warrnambool)
Warrnambool Weekly	Camperdown	No	current	2023–	
Waterloo Express and Narracan and Traralgon Shire Advertiser	Warragul	No	defunct	1880–1892	Later known as the Yarragon and Trafalgar Express and Narracan and Traralgon Shire Advertiser
Waverley Gazette	Mt. Waverley	No	defunct	1963–2001	Later known as the Waverley Leader
Waverley Leader	Blackburn	No	defunct	2001–2015	Merged with the Oakleigh Monash Leader to form the Monash Leader
Waverley Post	Ferntree Gully	No	defunct	1990–1995	Later known as the Monash Post
Waverley Progress	Glen Iris	No	defunct	1970–1972	Absorbed by Chadstone Progress
Weaver's Melbourne Business News	Frankston	No	defunct	2004	
Wedderburn Express	Wedderburn	No	defunct	1932–1964	Later known as the Wedderburn and Inglewood Express
Wedderburn Express and Korongshire Advertiser	Wedderburn	No	defunct	1888–1932	Later known as the Wedderburn Express
Wedderburn and Inglewood Express	Wedderburn	No	defunct	1965–1996	Later merged with the Boort and Quambatook Standard-Times to form the Loddon Times
Weed	Burwood	No	defunct	1973	Later known as Pandora's Box
Weekend Sporting Globe	Melbourne	Yes	defunct	1988–1966	Absorbed by the Sportsman (Sydney)
The Weekly Advertiser	Bendigo	No	defunct	1853–1895	Later known as the Bendigonian
Weekly Advertiser	Horsham	No	defunct	1998–2022	
Weekly Age	Melbourne	Yes	defunct	1862–1868	Absorbed by the Leader (Melbourne)
Weekly Argus	Melbourne	Yes	defunct	1855–1863	Other edition of The Argus. Merges with the Examiner and Melbourne Weekly News and The Yeoman, and Australian Acclimatiser to form The Australasian
Weekly Budget	Melbourne	Yes	defunct	1894–1901	Later known as the Million
The Weekly Chronicle, Mining Journal and General Advertiser for the Western gold fields of Victoria	Creswick	No	defunct	1855	
Weekly Dispatch	Bendigo	No	defunct	1862–1863	
Weekly Dispatch and Murray Boroughs Advertiser	Wangaratta	No	defunct	1860–1872	Later known as the Dispatch and North-Eastern Advertiser
Weekly Free Press and Port Phillip Commercial Advertiser	Port Phillip	Yes	defunct	1841	
Weekly Herald	Melbourne	Yes	defunct	1854–1856	
Weekly Mercury	Sandhurst	No	defunct	1859–1860	
The Weekly News	Melbourne	Yes	defunct	1869	
Weekly News	Yarraville	No	defunct	1905–1921	
The Weekly Pastime	Melbourne	Yes	defunct	1910–1911	
Weekly Review	Melbourne	Yes	defunct	2010–2012	
Weekly Review (Bayside)	Melbourne	Yes	defunct	2012–2013	Merged with the Bayside Review Local and the Port Phillip Review Local to become the Weekly Review (Bayside and Port Phillip)
Weekly Review (Greater Geelong)	South Melbourne	Yes	defunct	2012–2016	Later known as the Domain Geelong
Weekly Review (Heidelberg and Diamond Valley)	Port Melbourne	No	defunct	2010–2012	Merged with the Banyule and Nillumbik Weekly to form the Weekly Review (Ivanhoe and Valley)
Weekly Review (Ivanhoe and Valley)	Melbourne	Yes	defunct	2012–2018	Later known as the Domain Review (Ivanhoe and Valley)
Weekly Review (Melbourne Times)	South Melbourne	Yes	defunct	2013–2018	Later known as the Domain Review (Melbourne Times)
Weekly Review (Moonee Valley)	South Melbourne	Yes	defunct	2013–2018	Later known as the Domain Review (Moonee Valley)
Weekly Telegraph	Wangaratta	No	defunct	1992–2000	Later known as the North East Telegraph
Weekly Times	Melbourne	Yes	current	1869–	
Weekly Times Annual	Melbourne	Yes	defunct	1911–1934	Supplement to the Weekly Times
Weekly Trading Guide	Sale	No	defunct	1979–1988	
Werribee Advertiser	Werribee	No	defunct	1907–1908	Absorbed by the Bacchus Marsh Express
Werribee Banner	Narre Warren North	No	defunct	1984–2010	Later known as the Wyndham Weekly
The Werribee Express	Wyndham	No	defunct	1896–1936	
The Werribee-Hoppers Crossing-Laverton Westerner	South Melbourne	Yes	defunct	1990	
Werribee (Western) Independent	Sunshine	No	defunct	1991–1994	Later known as the Wyndham Independent
Werribee Shire Banner	Werribee	No	defunct	1909–1984	Later known as the Werribee Banner
Werribee Telegraph	Gisborne	No	defunct	1988	
Werribee Times	West Footscray	No	defunct	1996–2007	Later known as the Wyndham Leader
West Bourke Chronicle and Agricultural Gazette for Gisborne, Woodend, Bacchus Marsh	Gisborne	No	defunct	1864	Previously known as the West Bourke Chronicle and General Advertiser for Gisborne, Woodend, Bacchus Marsh
West Bourke Chronicle and General Advertiser for Gisborne, Woodend, Bacchus Marsh	Melbourne	Yes	defunct	1862–1863	Later known as the West Bourke Chronicle and Agricultural Gazette for Gisborne, Woodend, Bacchus Marsh
West Bourke and South Grant Guardian	Bacchus Marsh	No	defunct	1869–1870	
West Bourke Times	Flemington	No	defunct	1908–1909	Previously known as the West Bourke Times, Kensington, Flemington, Ascot Vale, Moonee Ponds and Essendon Reporter
West Bourke Times, Kensington, Flemington, Ascot Vale, Moonee Ponds and Essendon Reporter	Flemington	No	defunct	1887–1908	Later known as the West Bourke Times
The West Citizen	Geelong	No	defunct	1941–1960	Later known as the Times (Belmont)
The West Gippslander	Dandenong	No	defunct	1972–1977	Absorbed by the South Gippsland Sentinel Times
West Gippsland Express	Drouin	No	defunct	1917–1919	Absorbed by the Gippsland Independent, Buln Buln, Warragul, Berwick, Poowong and Jeetho Shire Advocate
West Gippsland Express, Buln Buln, Warragul, Berwick and Poowong and Jeetho Shires Advertiser	Drouin	No	defunct	1898–1917	Later known as the West Gippsland Express
West Gippsland Gazette	Warragul	No	defunct	1898–1930	Later known as the Warragul Gazette
West Gippsland Trader	Warragul	No	defunct	1981–1997	Later known as the Baw Baw Shire and West Gippsland Trader
West Melbourne Guardian	West Melbourne	Yes	defunct	1894	Later known as the North Melbourne Gazette
The Westsider	St Kilda	No	current	2014–	
West Wimmera Advocate	Edenhope	No	defunct	1995–2022	Later known as the Kowree Advocate
West Wimmera Mail	Horsham	No	defunct	1952–1959	Merged with the Horsham Times to form the Wimmera Mail-Times
West Wimmera Mail and Arapiles and Kowree Shires Advertiser	Natimuk	No	defunct	1919–1952	Later known as the West Wimmera Mail
West Wimmera Mail and Natimuk Advertiser	Natimuk	No	defunct	1887–1919	Later known as the West Wimmera Mail and Arapiles and Kowree Shires Advertiser
West Wimmera Messenger	Nhill	No	defunct	1999–2005	Later known as the Wimmera Messengers (West Wimmera ed)
Western Advertiser	Casterton	No	defunct	1972–1989	Later known as the Casterton News
Western Agriculturalist	Hamilton	No	defunct	1881–1897	
Western Independent	Sunshine	No	defunct	1987–1988	Splits to form the Western Independent (Melton / Bacchus Marsh), the Western Independent (Werribee / Hoppers Crossing), the Western Independent (Williamstown / Altona), the Western Independent (St Albans - Keilor), and the Western Independent (Footscray / Sunshine)
Western Independent (Footscray / Sunshine)	Sunshine	No	defunct	1988–1989	Merged with the Western Independent (St Albans - Keilor) to form the Western Independent (Sunshine/St Albans/Keilor edition)
Western Independent Footscray / Williamstown	Sunshine	No	defunct	1989–1992	Merged with the Western Independent (Sunshine/St Albans/Keilor edition) to form the Western Independent (Sunshine/Footscray edition)
Western Independent (Footscray/Williamstown/Altona edition)	Sunshine	No	defunct	1992–1994	Merged with the Western Independent (Sunshine/St Albans/Keilor edition) to form the Western Independent (Sunshine/Footscray edition)
Western Independent (Melton / Bacchus Marsh)	Sunshine	No	defunct	1988–1994	Later known as the Melton Independent
Western Independent (St Albans - Keilor)	Sunshine	No	defunct	1988–1989	Merged with the Western Independent (Footscray / Sunshine edition) to form the Western Independent (Sunshine/St Albans/Keilor edition)
Western Independent (Sunshine/Footscray edition)	Sunshine	No	defunct	1994	Later known as the Brimbank Independent
Western Independent (Sunshine/St Albans/Keilor edition)	Sunshine	No	defunct	1989–1994	Merged with the Western Independent (Footscray/Williamstown/Altona edition) to form the Western Independent (Sunshine/Footscray edition)
Western Independent Werribee / Altona	Sunshine	No	defunct	1989–1991	Later known as the Werribee (Western) Independent
Western Independent (Werribee / Hoppers Crossing)	Sunshine	No	defunct	1988	Merged with the Western Independent (Williamstown / Altona) to form the Western Independent (Werribee / Williamstown / Altona)
Western Independent (Werribee / Williamstown / Altona)	Sunshine	No	defunct	1988–1989	Splits to form the Western Independent Werribee / Altona, and the Western Independent Footscray / Williamstown
Western Independent (Williamstown / Altona)	Sunshine	No	defunct	1988	Merged with the Western Independent (Werribee / Hoppers Crossing) to form the Western Independent (Werribee / Williamstown / Altona)
Western News	Sunshine	No	defunct	1986	
Western Plains Advertiser	Camperdown	No	defunct	1961–2010	Later absorbed by the Camperdown Chronicle
Westernport Flyer	Rosebud	No	defunct	1989–1996	
Western Port Good Times	Hastings	No	defunct	1987–1991	Later known as the Western Port and Peninsula Good Times
Westernport News	Frankston	No	defunct	1950–1951	
Western Port News	Frankston	No	defunct	1963–1972	Later known as the Westernport-Peninsula News
Western Port News	Tyabb	No	current	2010–	Previously known as the Hastings News, and the Somerville News (merged)
Western Port and Peninsula Good Times	Hastings	No	defunct	1992–1993	Previously known as the Western Port Good Times
Westernport-Peninsula News	Melbourne	Yes	defunct	1972–1977	Absorbed by the Frankston-Peninsula News
Western Port Times and Phillip Island and Bass Valley Advertiser	Grantville	No	defunct	1898–1910	Previously known as the San Remo Times and Phillip Island and Bass Valley Advertiser
Western Port Trader	Hastings	No	defunct	1991–2010	Supplement to the Hastings Independent, and the Frankston-Hastings Independent. Later known as the Western Port Weekly
Western Port Weekly	Mornington	No	defunct	2010–2013	Merged with the Peninsula Weekly Mornington to form the Peninsula Weekly
Western Press and Camperdown, Colac, Mortlake and Terang Representative	Camperdown	No	defunct	1866–1870	Absorbed by the Hampden Guardian and Western Province Advertiser
Western Property News	Tullamarine	No	defunct	2003–2007	Later known as Western Star Real Estate
Western Star Real Estate	Tullamarine	No	defunct	2007	Previously known as Western Property News
Western Suburbs Advertiser	Footscray	No	defunct	1966–1968	Later known as the Footscray-Western Suburbs Advertiser
Western Times	Footscray	No	defunct	1982–2007	Later known as the Maribyrnong Leader
Whip	Melbourne	Yes	defunct	1881–1882	
Whitehorse Advertiser	Dandenong	No	defunct	2001	Previously known as the Whitehorse Journal
Whitehorse and Eastern Suburbs Standard	Cheltenham	No	defunct	1974–1978	Splits to form the Eastern Standard, and the Whitehorse Standard
Whitehorse Gazette	Blackburn	No	defunct	1995–2001	Later known as the Whitehorse Leader
Whitehorse Journal	Dandenong	No	defunct	1999–2001	Later known as the Whitehorse Advertiser
Whitehorse Leader	Northcote	No	defunct	2001–2020	Previously known as the Whitehorse Gazette
Whitehorse Post	Ferntree Gully	No	defunct	1995–1999	Later known as the Whitehorse Journal
Whitehorse Standard	Cheltenham	No	defunct	1971–1974	Merged with the Eastern Suburbs Standard to form the Whitehorse and Eastern Suburbs Standard
Whitehorse Standard	Box Hill	No	defunct	1978–1980	Absorbed by the Eastern Standard
Whitehorse Weekender	Wantirna	No	defunct	2002–2005	Later known as the Whitehorse Weekly
Whitehorse Weekly	Dandenong	No	defunct	2005–2007	Merged with the Manningham Weekly to form the Melbourne Weekly Eastern
Whittlesea Advertiser	Eltham North	No	defunct	1995	Merged with the Diamond Valley Advertiser to form the Diamond Valley - Whittlesea Advertiser
Whittlesea Chronicle	Yea	No	defunct	1988–1990	Absorbed by the Yea Chronicle
Whittlesea Leader	Northcote	No	defunct	2001–2020	Previously known as the Whittlesea Post
Whittlesea Post	Northcote	No	defunct	1924–2001	Later known as the Whittlesea Leader
Whittlesea Review	Kilmore	No	defunct	2010–2012	
Whittlesea Review	Kilmore	No	current	2019–	
Whittlesea Weekly	Airport West	No	defunct	2004–2008	Later known as the Northern Weekly
Willaura Farmer	Hamilton	No	defunct	1906–1916	
William Down's Australian Chronicle	Melbourne	Yes	defunct	1889	
Williamstown Advertiser	Footscray	No	defunct	1875–2010	Later known as the Hobsons Bay Weekly Williamstown
Williamstown Chronicle	Williamstown	No	defunct	1856–1964	Absorbed by the Williamstown Advertiser
Williamstown Trade Circular	Williamstown	No	defunct	1854–1856	Later known as the Williamstown Chronicle
Wilson's Sportsman's Review	Kew	No	defunct	1935–1989	Later known as Sportsman's Review
Wimmera Farmer	Horsham	No	defunct	1993–2012	Supplement to the Wimmera Mail-Times
Wimmera Free Press	Horsham	No	defunct	1987–1988	
Wimmera Mail-Times	Horsham	No	current	1959–	Previously known as the West Wimmera Mail, and the Horsham Times
Wimmera Messengers (Hindmarsh ed)	Nhill	No	defunct	2005–2010	Later known as the Nhill Free Press
Wimmera Messengers (West Wimmera ed)	Nhill	No	defunct	2005	Later known as the Kaniva Times
Wimmera Star	Horsham	No	defunct	1875–1927	Later known as the New Wimmera Star
Winchelsea and Birregurra Ensign	Winchelsea	No	defunct	1905–1909	
Winchelsea and Birregurra Mercury	Winchelsea	No	defunct	1903–1904	
Winchelsea Shire Advertiser	Birregurra	No	defunct	1910–1911	
Winchelsea Star	Winchelsea	No	defunct	1977–2011	
The Winner	Melbourne	Yes	defunct	1914–1918	
W. Montgomery's Federal News and Commercial Gazette	Melbourne	Yes	defunct	1889	
Wodonga Sentinel	Wodonga	No	defunct	1960–1968	Previously known as the Wodonga and Towong Sentinel
Wodonga and Towong Sentinel	Wodonga	No	defunct	1885–1960	Later known as the Wodonga Sentinel
Woman's Magazine	Melbourne	Yes	defunct	1946–1950	Supplement to The Argus
Woman's Progress	Ashburton	No	defunct	1960	Later known as Chadstone Progress
Woman Voter	Melbourne	Yes	defunct	1909–1919	
The Women's Newspaper	Melbourne	Yes	defunct	1928	
Wonthaggi Express	Wonthaggi	No	defunct	1952–1969	Previously known as the Powlett Express, Wonthaggi
Wonthaggi Sentinel	Wonthaggi	No	defunct	1953–1955	Later known as the Sentinel (Wonthaggi)
Wonthaggi Sentinel	Wonthaggi	No	defunct	1965–1973	Merged with the Times (Korumburra) to form the South Gippsland Sentinel Times
Wonthaggi Sentinel and State Town Miner	Wonthaggi	No	defunct	1910–1953	Later known as the Wonthaggi Sentinel
Woodend Star	Woodend	No	defunct	1888–1942	Later known as the Woodend Star and Macedon Advocate
Woodend Star and Macedon Advocate	Woodend	No	defunct	1942–1970	Later known as the Regional News-Gazette
Woodend Telegraph	Gisborne	No	defunct	1978–1981	Merged with the Gisborne and Macedon Telegraph and the Sunbury Telegraph to form the Macedon Ranges Telegraph
Wood's Point Leader	Wood's Point	No	defunct	1865–1866	
Wood's Point Times	Wood's Point	No	defunct	1865	Merged with the Mountaineer to become the Wood's Point Times and Mountaineer
Wood's Point Times and Mountaineer	Wood's Point	No	defunct	1865–1868	Previously known as the Wood's Point Times, and the Mountaineer (merged)
Woomelang Sun and Lascelles Advocate	Woomelang	No	defunct	1925–1955	Previously known as the Woomelang Sun and Lascelles and Ouyen Advocate
Woomelang Sun and Lascelles and Ouyen Advocate	Woomelang	No	defunct	1910–1925	Later known as the Woomelang Sun and Lascelles Advocate
Worker	Melbourne	Yes	defunct	1893–1895	
Worker's Voice	Melbourne	Yes	defunct	1933–1939	Later known as the Guardian (Melbourne)
The World	Melbourne	Yes	defunct	1881–1885	
World	West Melbourne	Yes	defunct	1994–1995	Previously known as the Truth
W. R. Bliss's Australian World	Melbourne	Yes	defunct	1889	
W. Skelton's Australian Times and Farmers' Gazette	Melbourne	Yes	defunct	1889	
W. T. Gocking's Victorian News and Farmers' Gazette	Melbourne	Yes	defunct	1889	
Wycheproof News	Wycheproof	No	defunct	1955–1961	Merged with the Mount Wycheproof Ensign and East Wimmera Advocate to form the New Wycheproof Ensign
Wyndham Independent	Sunshine	No	defunct	1995–1996	Previously known as the Werribee (Western) Independent
Wyndham Leader	Werribee	No	defunct	2007–2016	Previously known as the Werribee Times
Wyndhamshire Banner	Werribee	No	defunct	1902–1909	Later known as the Werribee Shire Banner
Wyndham Star Weekly	Airport West	No	current	2014–	Previously known as the Wyndham Weekly, and the Star, Werribee, Hoppers Crossing, Point Cook (merged)
Wyndham Weekly	Werribee	No	defunct	2010–2014	Merged with the Star, Werribee, Hoppers Crossing, Point Cook to form the Wyndham Star Weekly

== X ==
Newspaper	Town / suburb	Melbourne region	Status	Years of publication	Notes
Xin jin shan bulletin	Mount Waverley	No	defunct	2010–2018	Previously known as the Golden Land Education Weekly
Xpress India	Footscray	No	defunct	2009–2010	

== Y ==
Newspaper	Town / suburb	Melbourne region	Status	Years of publication	Notes
Yackandandah Times	Yackandandah	No	defunct	1890–1934	Previously known as the Benambra and Bogong Advertiser
Yallourn Live Wire	Yallourn	No	defunct	1962–1967	Merged with the Morwell Advertiser, and the Moe Advocate to form the Latrobe Valley Advocate and Advertiser
Yallourn and Newborough Advertiser	Yallourn	No	defunct	1955–1956	Absorbed by the Morwell Advertiser
Yarragon Advertiser	Yarragon	No	defunct	1919–1920	
Yarragon and Trafalgar Express	Warragul	No	defunct	1895–1933	Absorbed by the Warragul Guardian
Yarragon and Trafalgar Express and Narracan and Traralgon Shire Advertiser	Warragul	No	defunct	1893	Later known as the Yarragon and Trafalgar Express, Warragul and Narracan Shire Advertiser
Yarragon and Trafalgar Express, Warragul and Narracan Shire Advertiser	Warragul	No	defunct	1894	Later known as the Yarragon and Trafalgar Express and West Gippsland Advertiser
Yarragon and Trafalgar Express and West Gippsland Advertiser	Warragul	No	defunct	1894	Later known as the Yarragon and Trafalgar Express
Yarragon, Trafalgar and Moe Settlement News	Trafalgar	No	defunct	1904–1922	Later known as the Trafalgar and Yarragon News
Yarra Leader	Blackburn	No	defunct	1994–2005	Later known as the Melbourne Leader (Yarra ed)
Yarram Chronicle and South Gippsland Advertiser	Yarram	No	defunct	1886–1892	Later known as the South Gippsland Chronicle and Yarram and Alberton Advertiser
Yarram News	Sale	No	defunct	1957–1971	Merged with the Gippsland Standard and Alberton Shire Representative to form the Yarram Standard News
Yarram Standard	Yarram	No	defunct	2009–2020	Previously known as the Yarram Standard News
Yarram Standard News	Yarram	No	defunct	1971–2009	Later known as the Yarram Standard
Yarram Star	Port Albert	No	defunct	1972–1973	Later known as the Gippsland Star
Yarra Ranges Journal	Wantirna South	No	defunct	1999–2010	Later known as the Yarra Ranges Weekly
Yarra Ranges Post	Ferntree Gully	No	defunct	1995–1999	Later known as the Yarra Ranges Journal
Yarra Ranges Trader	Monbulk	No	defunct	1994–1997	Later known as the Ranges Trader
Yarra Ranges Weekly	Bayswater	No	defunct	2010–2013	Merged with the Maroondah Weekly to form the Maroondah and Yarra Ranges Weekly
Yarra Valley Express	Blackburn	No	defunct	1991–1993	Merged with the Lilydale Express to form the Lilydale and Yarra Valley Express
Yarra Valley Guardian Mail	Yarra Junction	No	defunct	1995–1997	Later known as the Upper Yarra Guardian Mail
Yarra Valley News	Ringwood	No	defunct	1966–1978	Merged with the Lilydale Shire Express to form the Lilydale and Yarra Valley Express
Yarra Valley Trader	Monbulk	No	defunct	1992–1992	Merged with the Hills Trader to form the Yarra Ranges Trader
Yarraville, Seddon and West Footscray Reporter	Footscray	No	defunct	1922–1928	
Yarrawonga Chronicle	Yarrawonga	No	current	1951–	Previously known as the Yarrawonga Chronicle and Riverina Advocate
Yarrawonga Chronicle and Bundalong, Burramine, and Peechelba Advertiser	Yarrawonga	No	defunct	1883–1888	Later known as the Yarrawonga Chronicle and Riverina Advocate
Yarrawonga Chronicle and Riverina Advocate	Yarrawonga	No	defunct	1888–1951	Later known as the Yarrawonga Chronicle
Yarrawonga Mercury and Lake Rowan, Tungamah and Mulwala (N.S.W.) News	Yarrawonga	No	defunct	1879–1882	Later known as the Yarrawonga Mercury and Malwala (N.S.W.) News
Yarrawonga Mercury and Malwala (N.S.W.) News	Yarrawonga	No	defunct	1882–1897	Later known as the Yarrawonga Mercury and Southern Riverina Advertiser
Yarrawonga Mercury and Southern Riverina Advertiser	Yarrawonga	No	defunct	1897–1927	
Yarrawonga Mercury and Tungamah and Lake Rowan Express and St. James Gazette	Yarrawonga	No	defunct	1927–1936	Absorbed by the Yarrawonga Chronicle and Riverina Advocate
Yea Chronicle	Yea	No	current	1890–	Previously known as the Yea Telegraph
Yea Telegraph	Yea	No	defunct	1885–1890	Later known as the Yea Chronicle
Yea Telephone and Upper Goulburn Advocate	Yea	No	defunct	1908–1912	Absorbed by the Yea Chronicle
Yeni Türkiye	Brunswick	No	defunct	1976–1999	
The Yeoman, and Australian Acclimatiser	Melbourne	Yes	defunct	1861–1864	Merged with the Examiner and Melbourne Weekly News and the Weekly Argus to form The Australasian
Yr Australydd : Cylchgrawn misol	Melbourne	Yes	defunct	1866–1872	
Yugoslav sloboda paper	Balaclava	No	defunct	1973	

== Z ==
Newspaper	Town / suburb	Melbourne region	Status	Years of publication	Notes
Zündnadeln	Richmond	No	defunct	1873	
