= List of defunct newspapers of Australia =

This is a list of defunct newspapers of Australia. For current Australian newspapers, see List of newspapers in Australia.

== National ==
- Business Review Weekly (1981–2013)
- The Bulletin (1880–2008)
- Nation (1958–1972)
- Nation Review (1972–1981)
- The National Times (later The Times on Sunday) (1971–1987)
- Trading Post (until 2009) - 22 regional editions across Australia

== New South Wales ==
For defunct newspapers in New South Wales, refer to List of newspapers in New South Wales.

== Victoria ==
=== Defunct Melbourne newspapers ===
- The Argus (1846–1957)
- The Australasian (became the Australasian Post in 1946, 1838–2002)
- Australasian Sketcher with Pen and Pencil (1873–1889)
- Box Hill Reporter (1889–1918)
- Brighton Southern Cross
- Broadford Courier
- Broadmeadows Camp Sentry
- Brunswick and Coburg Leader
- Brunswick and Coburg Star
- Camberwell and Hawthorn Advertiser
- Caufield and Elsternwick Leader
- Coburg Leader
- Collingwood Fitzroy Mercury
- Daily Telegraph (1869–1892)
- Dandenong Advertiser
- Elsternwick Leader
- Eltham and Whittlesea Shires Advertiser
- Essendon Gazette
- Evelyn Observer
- Fitzroy City Press
- Flemington Spectator
- The Footscray Advertiser (1874–1982)
- Footscray Chronicle
- Frankston Standard
- The Graphic of Australia
- Hawthorn Citizen
- Healesville and Yarra Glen Guardian
- Heidelberg News
- The Herald (1840–1990)
- The Sunday Times
- Hurstbridge Advertiser
- The Illustrated Australian News
- Independent
- Labor Call
- The Leader
- Lilydale Express
- Malvern Courier and Caulfield Mirror
- Malvern News
- Malvern Standard
- Marlborough & Dunolly Advertiser
- Melbourne Advertiser (1 January 1838 – 1851)
- The Melbourne Express (5 February 2001 – 10 September 2001)
- Melbourne Punch
- Melbourne Star (1934)
- Melton Express
- Mercury (Fitzroy)
- Moorabbin News
- Mornington Standard
- mX (free afternoon commuter newspaper)
- Newsday (30 September 1969 – 3 May 1970)
- North Melbourne Advertiser (1873–1894)
- North Melbourne Courier and West Melbourne Advertiser (1895–1913)
- North Melbourne Gazette (1894–1901)
- Oakleigh and Caulfield Times
- Oakleigh Standard
- The Paper (Melbourne)
- Prahran Chronicle
- Prahran Telegraph (1860–1930)
- Port Melbourne Standard
- Port Phillip Gazette (1838–1851)
- Public Opinion
- Record (Melbourne paper)
- Richmond Australian
- Richmond Guardian
- Ringwood and Croydon Chronicle
- Sandringham News
- Sandringham Southern Cross
- Sealake Times
- Seaside News
- Smith's Weekly
- South Bourke and Mornington Journal
- South Bourke Standard
- Spectator Methodist Chronicle
- Sporting Judge
- The Sun (1922–1924)
- The Sun News-Pictorial (1922–1990)
- Sunbury News
- The Sunday Herald
- The Sunday Sun
- Sunshine Advocate
- Table Talk (1885–1939)
- Talbot Leader
- Terang Express
- Trading Post (1966–2009)
- Trafalgar and Yarragon Times
- Traralgon Record
- Truth
- Vigilante
- Weekly News (Yarraville)
- Weekly Times (Melbourne)
- Williamstown Advertiser
- Williamstown Chronicle
- Winner (1914–1917)

=== Defunct regional newspapers ===
- Alpine Observer
- Ararat Chronicle and Willaura and Lake Bolac Districts Recorder
- Avoca Free Press
- Avoca Mail
- Bacchus Marsh Express
- Ballan Times
- Bealiba Times
- Benalla Independent
- Bendigonian
- Berringa Herald
- Beulah Record and Mallee Advocate
- Beulah Standard
- Birchip Advertiser
- Birrengurra Times
- Boort Standard
- Bruthen and Tambo Times
- Bunyip Free Press and Berwick Shire Guardian
- Camperdown Herald
- Casteron Free Press
- Casteron News
- Castlemaine Advertiser (1858–1862)
- Castlemaine Leader (1883–1915)
- Castlemaine Representative (1870–1883)
- Chiltern and Howlong Times
- Clunes Guardian and Gazette
- Cobden Times
- Colac Reformer
- Coleraine Albion and Western Advertiser
- Cressy and Lismore Pioneer
- Creswick Advertiser
- Dimboola Chronicle (1921–29)
- Donald Times
- Dookie and Katamatite
- Dunmunkle Standard
- Dunolly and Betbet Shire Express
- Echuca and Moama Advertiser
- Elsternwick Leader (1887–1902)
- Euroa Advertiser
- Evelyn Observer (1873–1942)
- Federal Standard
- Foster Mirror and South Gippsland Shire Advocate
- Toora and Welshpool Ensign
- Gippsland Farmers Journal
- Gippsland Guardian (1855–1868)
- Gippsland Independent
- Gippsland Mercury
- Gippsland Standard
- Gippslander and Mirboo Times
- Gisborne Gazette
- Glengary, Toongabbie & Cowwarr Journal and Central Gippsland Reporter
- Gordon, Ergerton and Ballan Advertiser
- Great Southern Advocate
- Great Southern Star
- Grenville Advocate
- Grenville Standard
- Heyfield Herald
- Heytesbury Reformer
- Hopetoun Courier and Mallee Pioneer
- Horsham Times
- Inglewood Advertiser
- Jamieson and Wood's Point Chronicle
- Kerang New Times
- Kerang Observer
- Kerang Times
- Kerang Times and Swan Hill Gazette (1877–1889)
- Kilmore Advertiser
- Kilmore Free Press
- Kooweerup Sun, Lang Lang Guardian and Cranbourne Shire Record
- Korong Vale Lance
- Korot Sentinel and Tower Hill Advocate
- Kyabram Free Press and Rodney and Deakin Shire Advocate
- Kyabram Guardian
- Kyabram Union (1886–1894)
- Kyneton Guardian
- Lancefield Mercury and West Bourke Agricultural Record
- Lang Lang Guardian
- Lilydale Express
- Lismore, Derrinallum and Cressy Advertiser
- Maffra Spectator
- Maldon News
- McIvor Times & Rodney Advertiser
- Melton Express
- Mildura Cultivator
- Mildura Independent star
- Mildura Telegraph
- Miner's Right and Castlemaine Advertiser (1856–1858)
- Minyup Guardian
- Mornington Standard (1911–1939)
- Morwell Advertiser (1876–1972)
- North Eastern Ensign
- Numurkah Standard
- Omeo Standard
- Our Daily News Castlemaine (1862–1869)
- Ouyen Mail
- Ouyen Mail West Express
- Ovens Constitution (1856–1871)
- Pakenham Gazette and Berwick Shire News
- Penshurst Free Press
- Pitfield Banner and Hollybush Times
- Port Fairy Gazette
- Port Fairy Times and Macarthur News
- Port Melbourne Standard
- Portland Guardian (1842–1964)
- Portland Observer
- Powlett Express
- Quambatook Times
- Queenscliff Sentinel
- Rainbow Argus
- Riverine Herald
- Rushworth Chronicle and Goulburn Advertiser (1886–1977)
- Sandringham Southern Cross
- Sentinel
- Seymour Express
- South Bourke and Mornington Journal
- South Gippsland Shire Echo
- St Arnaud Mercury
- Stawell News and Pleasant Creek Chronicle
- Stock and Land
- Stratford Sentinel and Briagolong Express
- Traralgon Record (1883–1932)
- Tungamah and Lake Rowan Express
- Upper Murray and Mitta Herald Chronicle
- Utima and Chillonga Star
- Violet Town Sentinel
- Walhalla Chronicle
- Warracknambeal Herald
- Warragul Guardian
- Warrnambool Standard
- Wedderburn Express
- Werribee Shire Banner
- West Gippsland Gazette
- West Wimmera Mail and Natimuk Advertiser
- Willaura Farmer
- Wodonga and Towong Sentinel (1885–1954)
- Woodend Star
- Woomeland Sun and Lascelles and Ouyen
- Yackandandah Times (1890–1934)
- Yarrawonga Mercury and Southern Riverina Advertiser
- Yr Australydd

== Queensland ==
=== Defunct Brisbane newspapers ===
- The Catholic Age (1892–1929)
- Daily Mail (1903–1933)
- mX (2001–2015)
- The National Leader (1916–1918)
- Queensland Country Life (1900–1910)
- The Queenslander (1866–1939)
- The Telegraph (1872–1988)
- Truth (1900–1954)

=== Defunct regional newspapers ===
- Bayside Bulletin
- Blackwater Herald
- Bundaberg star and Burnett River times (1875–1879)
- Cairns Argus
- Central Telegraph
- The Central Queensland Herald
- The Charleville Times
- Cooktown Independent
- Coolangatta Chronicle
- Dayboro Times and Moreton Mail
- The Humpybong Weekly and Advertiser
- The Logan and Albert Advocate
- The Logan Witness
- Murgon Advertiser
- North Queensland Telegraph and Territorial Separationist
- Northern Age and North Queensland Telegraph
- Northern Boomerang
- Queensland Telegraph
- St George Standard and Balonne Advertiser

== Western Australia ==
=== Defunct Perth newspapers ===
- The Call (1904–1953)
- Daily News (1840–1990)
- Fremantle Herald (1913–1919)
- The Herald (1867–1886)
- The Independent (1969–1986)
- The Mirror (1921–1956)
- Perth Morning Herald (1896–1909)
- Truth (1903–1931)
- The Western Mail (1885–1955), renamed Countryman
- The Western Mail (1980–1988)

== South Australia ==
=== Defunct Adelaide newspapers ===
- About Town (December 1979–August 1981)
- Adelaide Aeroplane (November 1919–February 1920)
- Adelaide Echo (September–October 1877)
- Adelaide Guardian (September–October 1839)
- Adelaide Morning Chronicle (June 1852–November 1853)
- Adelaider Deutsche Zeitung (1851–1862), German-language paper
- Australische Zeitung (1874–1916) German-language newspaper
- Weekly Herald, Herald, and Daily Herald Labor weekly then daily
- Die Deutsche Post (1848–1850 or later), German-language paper, mentioned in Australische Zeitung
- Evening Journal (1869–1912), became The News
- The Express (Adelaide), 1864–1867
- The Express and Telegraph (1867–1922)
- The Independent Weekly (since 2010 online only as InDaily)
- The Journal (1912–1923), previously Evening Journal and continued as The News
- The News (1923–1992), continuation of The Journal
- Port Adelaide News (1878–1933), a weekly (and for a time bi-weekly) published which folded and restarted several times
- Quiz (1889–1890, 1900–1909), a satirical weekly; incorporated into Quiz and the Lantern (1890–1900)
- The Register, newspaper in Adelaide
- The South Australian (1844–1851), previously Southern Australian
- South Australian Chronicle (July 1858 – 1955) published weekly under various similar titles by The Advertiser
- South Australian Gazette and Colonial Register (1837–1931)
- South Australian Register
- Southern Australian (1838–1844) became The South Australian
- Süd Australische Zeitung (1849–1874) predecessor of Australische Zeitung
- Truth four different newspapers between 1890 and 1964, the last one part of the Norton stable
- The Voice (1892–1894) political weekly founded by J. Medway Day

=== Defunct regional newspapers ===
- The Bridge Observer (Murray Bridge) – a free community paper c. 1971–1976, revived briefly 1983
- Herald (Tanunda) (1860–c2020), previously known as Barossa and Light Herald
- The Kapunda Herald (1864–1951)
  - The Midlands Gazette - a section of The Kapunda Herald
  - The Northern Star - predecessor
- The Roxby Downs Sun (Roxby Downs) – discontinued August 2015
- Süd-Australische Zeitung - German-language newspaper variously from Tanunda and Adelaide
- Tanunda Deutsche Zeitung - German-language newspaper from Tanunda, founded by C. H. Barton
- The Warrigal Review (1901) - "a newspaper published by the South Australian Sixth Contingent, Imperial Bushmen, on board the steamship Warrigal on route to Durban during the South African War". Its single issue was printed by the Natal Mercury.

== Tasmania ==
=== Defunct Hobart newspapers ===
- The Clipper (1893–1909)
- The Hobart Town Gazette (1816–1821)
- Saturday Evening Mercury (1954–1984)
- The World (1918–1925)
- The Critic (1904–1924 or later).

=== Defunct regional newspapers ===
- The Leven Lever
- The West Coast Miner
- The Daily Telegraph (Launceston)
- The Tasmanian (Launceston)

== Northern Territory ==
- Army News (1941–1946) - for the troops stationed in Darwin
- Moonta Herald and Northern Territory Gazette (1869)
- The Darwin Sun (1981–1982) - a community newsletter
- The North Australian (1883–1889)
- The North Australian and Northern Territory Government Gazette (1889–1890)
- The Northern Standard (1921–1955)
- The Northern Territory Times (1927–1932)
- The Northern Territory Times and Gazette (1873–1927)

== Australian Capital Territory ==
- The Chronicle (Canberra) (1981–2020)

== Other newspapers (unsorted) ==
- The Arrow
- The Australian Children's Newspaper
- Yr Australydd
- Bell's Life in Sydney and Sporting Reviewer
- The Braidwood Dispatch and Mining Journal
- The Chaser
- The Children's Newspaper (Australia)
- Colonial Times
- The Courier
- Daily News
- Empire Times
- The Farmer and Settler
- Filmnews
- Kiama Examiner
- The Labor News
- The Leader (NSW: 1946–1949)
- The Liverpool Herald (NSW: 1897–1907)
- Ovens Constitution
- The News
- The Sun News-Pictorial
- Telegraph
- Western Argus
- Western Mail
- The Wild Goose
- The Worker
