= The Delegate Argus =

The Delegate Argus, first published as The Delegate Argus and Border Post, was a weekly English language newspaper published in Delegate, New South Wales, Australia from 1895 to 1943.

== History ==
The Delegate Argus and Border Post was first published on 16 October 1895 by J. Plowright and C. Dawson. The paper's name was shortened to The Delegate Argus in 1906. The Delegate Argus ceased publication in 1943.

== Digitisation ==
The paper has been digitised as part of the Australian Newspapers Digitisation Program project of the National Library of Australia.

== See also ==
- List of newspapers in Australia
- List of defunct newspapers of Australia
- List of newspapers in New South Wales
