= The Kiama Independent and Illawarra and Shoalhaven Advertiser =

The Kiama Independent and Illawarra and Shoalhaven Advertiser, also published originally as Kiama Examiner, then as The Examiner (Kiama, New South Wales), was a weekly English language newspaper published in Kiama, New South Wales, Australia. It was also published as The Kiama Independent and Shoalhaven Advertiser and since 1947 as Kiama Independent.

Front page of The Kiama Independent and Illawarra and Shoalhaven Advertiser, 21 July 1863

== History ==
The Kiama Independent and Illawarra and Shoalhaven Advertiser was published in 1863. Its original title was Kiama Examiner, which was published from 24 April 1858 to 10 December 1859. It was succeeded by The Examiner which was published from 17 December 1859 to 30 December 1862. Then The Kiama Independent and Illawarra and Shoalhaven Advertiser was published from 7 July to 6 October 1863. Following this, the newspaper was named The Kiama Independent and Shoalhaven Advertiser and was published from 13 October 1863 to 2 April 1947. In 1947 it merged with Kiama Reporter and Illawarra Journal to form Kiama Independent. Over the decades and under differing titles, it has at times been published weekly, biweekly or triweekly.

== Digitisation ==
The Kiama Independent and Illawarra and Shoalhaven Advertiser has been digitised as part of the Australian Newspapers Digitisation Program of the National Library of Australia.

== See also ==
- List of newspapers in Australia
- List of newspapers in New South Wales
