= Granville Independent and Parramatta Advertiser =

The Granville Independent and Parramatta Advertiser was a short-lived English language regional broadsheet newspaper published in Granville, Sydney, Australia, from 1900 to 1901. The paper circulated in the townships of Parramatta, Granville, Clyde, Auburn, Newington, Rookwood, Flemington, Strathfield, Bankstown, Merrylands, Guildford and Fairfield.

== History ==
The Granville Independent and Parramatta Advertiser prospectus was released August 1900, by the company Neale & Co. The proprietor, Robert George Neale, a newspaper publisher of over 40-year's experience in Australia and New Zealand, established the paper's office and printing works in South Street, Granville, with the first issue of the Granville Independent and Parramatta Advertiser released on 14 September 1900, and issued weekly on Fridays for the cost of one penny.

Neale & Co. relocated to the Albert Hall Buildings, on Sydney Road (now Parramatta Road), Granville, with issue Vol. 1, No. 19, dated Friday, 18 January 1901 of the Granville Independent and Parramatta Advertiser, the first to be published from this location.

In May 1901, R.G. Neale announced his retirement from newspaper publishing, and that he had sold the Granville Independent and Parramatta Advertiser to Mr H. Marcus, a reporter originating from Ipswich, Queensland. The Granville Independent and Parramatta Advertiser continued on for a short time after, although it is not known when it ceased publication. Marcus had transferred his business interests to Waerley in the Eastern Suburbs of Sydney, by December 1901.

== Availability ==
Hardcopy of the Granville Independent and Parramatta Advertiser is available from the first issue dated Friday, 14 September 1900 through to Vol. 1, No. 29, Friday, 29 March 1901. These issues are held by the State Library of New South Wales in offsite storage.

Gosford Micrographics Pty Ltd filmed the available issues of the Granville Independent and Parramatta Advertiser onto a single reel of microfilm in August 1993. This microfilm can be viewed at the State Library of New South Wales, the library services at Cumberland Council and City of Parramatta Council, and the National Library of Australia.

All available issues of the Granville Independent and Parramatta Advertiser are available online via the National Library of Australia Trove digitised newspaper website.

== See also ==
- List of newspapers in Australia
- List of defunct newspapers of Australia
- List of newspapers in New South Wales
