= The Auburn and Lidcombe Advance =

The Auburn & Lidcombe Advance was an English-language local tabloid newspaper first published in Auburn, Sydney, Australia, from the 1920s to 1940s. The paper's masthead claimed the publication was "an independent journal devoted to the advancement of Auburn, Lidcombe and surrounding districts."

== History ==
The Auburn & Lidcombe Advance was printed and published by Alf Membrey, at his printing works located at 32 Auburn Road, Auburn. The first issue was released in c. 1920, and the paper was published weekly on Thursdays for the cost of one penny.

By 1933, Membrey's printing works had relocated to 52 Auburn Road, Auburn.

In 1934 The Auburn News & Lidcombe Advance became a free community newspaper, with the volume number reverting to I. By December 1935, the paper had a guaranteed circulation of 10,000.

By March 1937, the newspaper had been retitled The Advance, and Membrey's printing works had moved again, this time to Queen Street, Auburn. By the end of 1939 The Advance had reverted to a subscription-based newspaper, once more costing readers one pence.

The Advance ceased publication during World War II, due to the difficulties Membrey had in securing both staff and newsprint.

== Availability ==
Only a total of 14 issues of The Auburn & Lidcombe Advance and The Advance, dated between 1925 and 1939 exist in hardcopy, which are held by the State Library of New South Wales.

Gosford Micrographics Pty Ltd filmed the available issues of The Auburn & Lidcombe Advance and The Advance onto a single reel of microfilm in April 2000. This microfilm can be viewed at the State Library of New South Wales and the Cumberland Library Service.

All available issues of The Auburn & Lidcombe Review are available online via the National Library of Australia's Trove website.

== See also ==
- List of newspapers in Australia
- List of defunct newspapers of Australia
- List of newspapers in New South Wales
