= Newsday (disambiguation) =

Newsday is an American newspaper in Long Island. Also distributed in the New York City metropolitan area.

Newsday may also refer to:

== Newspapers ==
- New York Newsday, Times Mirror Company New York City newspaper (1985–1995)
- Newsday (Melbourne), an Australian afternoon daily newspaper (1969–1970)
- NewsDay (Zimbabwean newspaper), a Zimbabwean newspaper
- Trinidad and Tobago Newsday, a Trinidadian daily newspaper, with a separate daily edition for Tobago known as Tobago Newsday

== Radio and television ==
- Newsday (9News), a former newscast on 9TV, now CNN Philippines
- Newsday (radio programme), a radio programme on BBC World Service
- Newsday (TV programme), a newscast on BBC World News
- PVO NewsDay, an Australian television programme
