= Lamington =

Australian cake

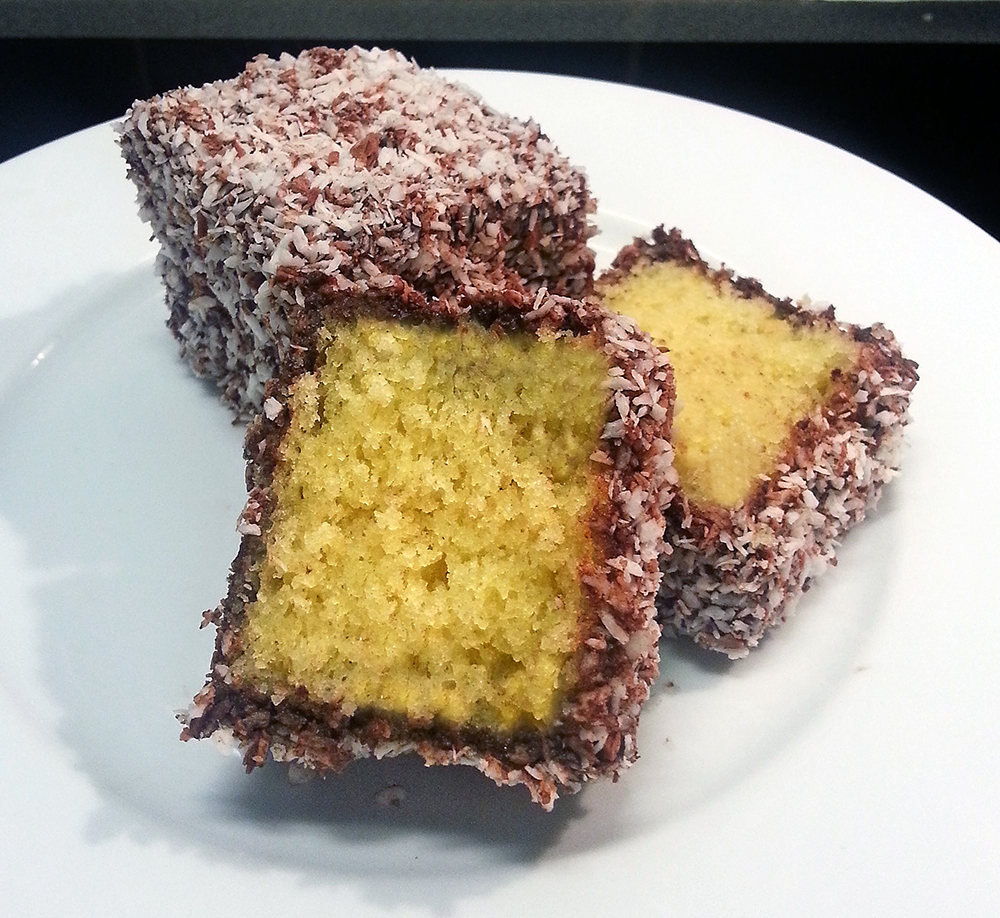
- Lamington cut open
- Type: Sponge cake
- Place of origin: Australia
- Region or state: Queensland
- Main ingredients: Cake, chocolate sauce, desiccated coconut

A lamington is an Australian cake made from squares of butter cake or sponge cake coated in an outer layer of chocolate sauce and rolled in desiccated coconut. The thin mixture is absorbed into the outside of the sponge cake and left to set, giving the cake a distinctive texture. A common variation has a layer of cream or strawberry jam between two lamington halves.

== Origins ==
Lamingtons are believed to be named after either Lord Lamington, who served as Governor of Queensland from 1896 to 1901, or his wife, Lady Lamington. Most sources incline to the former. The earliest known reference to the naming of the lamington, from June 1927, links the cake to Lord Lamington.

The identity of the recipe's inventor has also been debated. Most stories attribute its creation to Lord Lamington's chef, the French-born Armand Galland, who was called upon at short notice to feed unexpected guests. Using only the limited ingredients available, Galland cut up some left-over French vanilla sponge cake baked the day before, dipped the slices in chocolate and set them in coconut. Impressed by Galland's creation, Lamington's guests were said to have later asked for the recipe. This version of events is supported by Lady Lamington's memoirs. Coconut was not widely used in European cooking at that time, but was known to Galland, whose wife was from Tahiti, where coconut was a common ingredient.

One account suggests that the lamington was first served in Toowoomba, when Lord Lamington took his entourage to Harlaxton House to escape the steamy heat of Brisbane, whereas another claims that it was created by Galland at Queensland's Government House in Brisbane during the busy period leading up to Federation in 1901. A further alternative claim is that Lord Lamington's cook, presumably Galland, accidentally dropped a block of sponge cake into a dish of chocolate. It was later discovered that desiccated coconut, sprinkled over the top, made the cakes more appealing.

The first known mention of "Lamington cake" appears in an 1896 newspaper account of a "Lamington Function" at Laidley in Queensland. The event was in honour of Lord Lamington (although it appears he did not attend) and also featured "Lamington Tea", "Lamington Soup" etc., so, in the absence of any description of the cake, the name of the cake might signify nothing more than the name of the event. A 1900 recipe for Lamington Cakes has been found in the Queensland Country Life newspaper. While the recipe originated in Queensland, it spread quickly, appearing in a Sydney newspaper in 1901 and a New Zealand newspaper in 1902. However, none of these recipes indicate the creator of the recipe nor the reason for its name.

A 2014 April Fools' Day story from Guardian Australia falsely claimed the lamington to have been based on a previously unknown New Zealand cake known as a "Wellington". This hoax origin story was later repeated by other sources.

Lamingtons are typically baked in a Lamington pan named for the cake.

== Modern-day ==
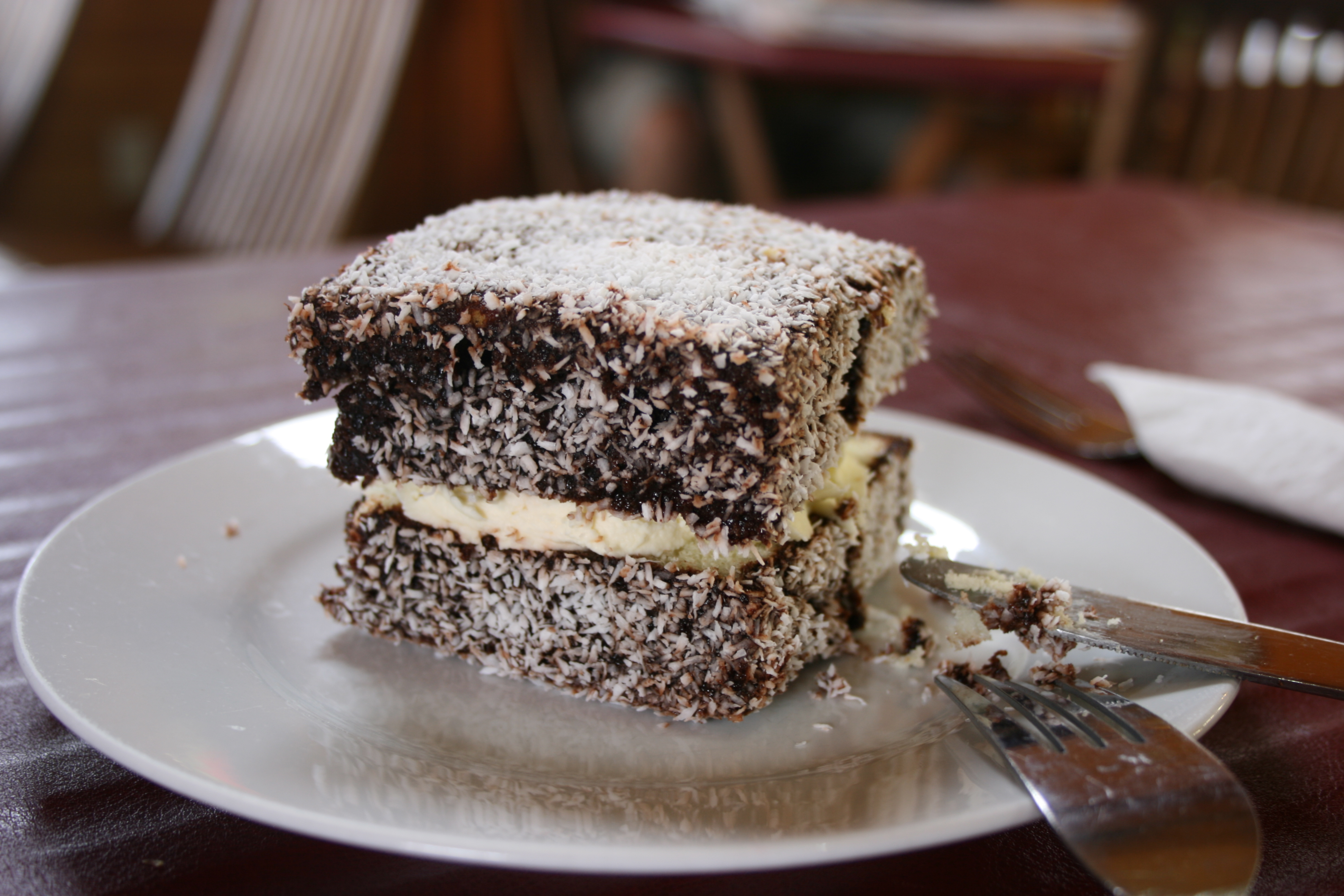
A cream-filled lamington in New Zealand

Lamingtons remain a popular treat across Australia and New Zealand, and 21 July was designated as National Lamington Day in Australia. Lamingtons are often sold at fundraisers for schools or charity groups, known as "lamington drives". Some Australians shorten the name to "Lammo" (singular) or "Lammos" (plural).

There are many variations on the basic lamington recipe, including different colours, flavours, and sizes.

=== Similar cakes in other countries ===
Hungary has a similar item is known as kókuszkocka, or coconut squares.

Romanian cuisine calls the Lamington prăjitură tăvălită cu cocos or "cake tumbled in coconut" and has a wide range of variations including different sauces and nuts and adding rum or orange or lemon zest to the cake. It is also sometimes referred to as prăjitură cuburi or cake in cubes.

In Malta, a popular version known as Pink Lamingtons, or pasti roża (also pasti mir-roża), is commonly found in bakeries. The sponge cake is coated in a fruit-flavoured jelly mixture and then rolled in desiccated coconut, resulting in a bright pink and sweet treat often enjoyed by children. This is also known as bambaluna.

South Africa has a similar but smaller-sized confection known as ystervarkies (little porcupines).

In the U.S. city of Cleveland, they are called coconut bars.

The British Overseas Territory of St Helena Island has a similar variation called coconut fingers, made traditionally for special occasions such as weddings and birthdays.

In Croatia, Bosnia and Herzegovina and Serbia, the čupavci is a similar cake. Čupavci are one of the most popular Christmas desserts in Croatia. Slovenia, Romania and Hungary have similar cakes.

In Mauritius, there is a dessert which is a variant of the Lamington cake; It is called the "red Lamington cake", also known as "gato carré rouge" (lit. "red cube cake" or "red square cake" in English and gâteau carré rouge in French) or "gato Francis" (lit. "Francis cake" in English or gâteau Francis in French). Red dye is used to give the cake its red colour; square pieces of the cake are soaked in the red dye completely and then coated with desiccated coconut, and whipped cream is applied on the top surface of the cake. A half candied cherry or half a strawberry can also be applied on top of the cream as topping. The cake is sometimes strawberry flavoured.

== Awards ==
In 2009, as part of the Q150 celebrations, the lamington was announced as one of the Q150 Icons of Queensland for its role as an iconic "innovation and invention".

== See also ==
- Australian cuisine
- Coconut cake
- List of desserts
