= Southern Pacific Petroleum Company =

- Type: Private
- Industry: Oil drilling
- Founded: September 1920
- Founder: C. C. Jackson & J. B. Weger
- Defunct: 1925
- Fate: Failure to strike oil
- Headquarters: 103 William Street, Melbourne
- Area served: Gippsland, Victoria

The Southern Pacific Petroleum Company was an Australian speculative oil-drilling syndicate based in Victoria during the 1920s. It was established in 1920 by prominent Melbourne accountant Charles Jackson, who partnered with a group of private investors to investigate petroleum prospects in Gippsland. It is credited with promoting interest in petroleum exploration in Victoria and contributing significantly to the state's speculative "oil boom" during the early 1920s.

== History ==
=== Background ===
In 1884, Archibald Hunter and John Buntine reported discovering oil shale near Toongabbie. Their efforts led to the formation of the Gippsland Shale and Oil Company, but the shale contained insufficient oil for commercial extraction and the venture was abandoned. Interest was revived in 1915 when the Gippsland Farmers Journal published accounts of Buntine's discovery, followed by reports of renewed prospecting around Toongabbie.

The renewed activity formed part of a broader revival of petroleum exploration in Australia. During the 1910s, private prospectors and companies including the Anglo-Persian Oil Company investigated potential oilfields, but no commercially viable petroleum deposits had been discovered. Interest in Victoria intensified going into the 1920s, following the appointment of William Baragwanath as Director of the Geological Survey of Victoria. Under his direction, petroleum exploration in Gippsland became one of the survey's principal activities. By August 1920, three Melbourne syndicates were prospecting for oil between Toongabbie and Traralgon.

=== Formation ===
The Southern Pacific Petroleum Company emerged from this renewed interest in Gippsland petroleum. Petroleum expert Joseph Barnard Weger reported oil and gas indications in streams near Toongabbie and entered into an agreement with a group of several investors led by Charles Jackson to drill a bore at Tyers, in the Parish of Boola Boola.

== Boola Boola Petroleum and Natural Gas Company ==
The Boola Boola Petroleum and Natural Gas Company was formally established at a shareholders' meeting in Traralgon on 4 March 1921, with Jackson appointed legal manager and Weger as field superintendent. Weger's contract covered the preparation of plans, construction of the drilling plant and sinking of a bore to a depth of up to 900 metres. His findings were promoted through newspaper advertisements, while Jackson sought investors in Gippsland. A company was subsequently organised to finance the drilling operation.

The Boola Boola Petroleum and Natural Gas Company was formally established at a shareholders' meeting in Traralgon on 4 March 1921, with Jackson appointed legal manager and Weger as field superintendent. Shares attracted substantial interest among local investors, and Weger oversaw preparations for drilling while expressing confidence in the area's prospects. The venture attracted wider attention as the Commonwealth government sought to encourage petroleum discovery. In 1920, it offered a £50,000 reward for the discovery of petroleum deposits in Australia capable of commercial exploitation.

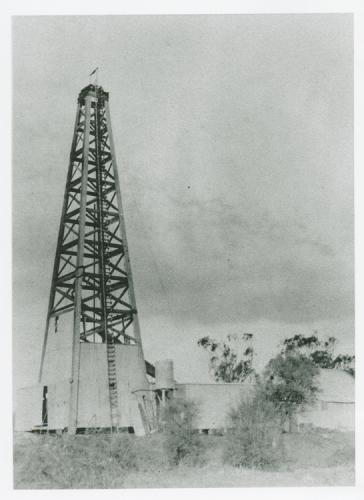
Boola Boola bore, c1922

Drilling of the Boola Boola bore commenced on 26 September 1921. The drilling plant, workmen's quarters, an engine house and a large timber derrick (25 metres high) were built by the Goldfields Diamond Drilling Company to plans supplied by Weger. The company received negative attention after the Mines Department published a report claiming there was no direct evidence to show commercially viable deposits of petroleum existed in Victoria.

Furthermore, esteemed geologist Edgeworth David questioned the authenticity of the samples taken by Weger at the Boola Boola site years prior, suggested that he had likely mistaken petroleum gas for iridescent film of oxide or iron carbonate. Jackson took out a large front page article in the Gippsland Farmers Journal to defend the operation, and assured shareholders that the funds were "in hand".

In July 1922, the plant closed after a broken piece of casing let in significant amounts of sand and water into the bore, which in turn snapped the drill pipe. Furthermore, there was difficulty fishing out the broken casing, which had become "frozen" to the earth. Weger's contract was subsequently terminated by the directors on the grounds of insufficient progress, as the bore had only reached a depth of 290 metres by the time it was meant to have reached 910 metres.

Lengthy and heated discussions were held at the company's subsequent half-yearly meeting, where the Chairman assured shareholders that the company had experienced "bad luck in every respect". A subsequent meeting was held to consider giving the Australian Oil Corporation an option over the Boola Boola site, however, the company ultimately did not accept. New casing was ordered from America, and drilling resumed in March 1923 with a new rotary plant and pumps installed the following month. During this period, Weger began drilling on a nearby property.

== Toongabbie Oil Wells ==
In December 1921, Toongabbie Oil Wells was established as an associate company of the Southern Pacific Petroleum Company. It was set up to pursue oil drilling in the Parish of Toongabbie South, and acquired a vast property for tests.

== Great Southern Oil Wells ==
A second company known as the Great Southern Oil Wells was formed just months later, after Jackson secured the sole option over 11,000 hectares immediately adjoining the Toongabbie Oil Wells property.

== Key people ==
=== Charles Jackson (legal manager) ===
Charles Columbine Jackson (often stylised as C.C. Jackson, 1886–19??), was an Australian accountant, oil prospector and realestate developer. He was born and educated in England before arriving in Melbourne, where he started an accounting firm in Melbourne with his brother, Basil John Jackson. In November 1923, Charles and his brother established a private realestate agency known as the Batman Realty Co. The firm offered auctioneering services and managed residential/industrial subdivision of its own. Large estates were constructed at Heidelberg, Sunshine, and Phillip Island. Jackson was made a Justice for Peace in New South Wales in June 1921.

=== Directors ===
- Ralph Sadleir Falkiner (1877–1944)
- John Herbert Cooke (1867–1943)
- J. T. Hargreaves
- F. W. Myers
