= The Herald (Adelaide) =

Newspaper of South Australia (1894–1924)

The Herald was a weekly trade union magazine published in Adelaide, South Australia between 1894 and March 1910; for the first four years titled The Weekly Herald. It was succeeded by The Daily Herald, which ran from 7 March 1910 to 16 June 1924.

== History ==
The 1890s was a period of intense industrial unrest in Australia: squatters and shippers, manufacturers, merchants and miners had all been doing very nicely in the 1880s with exports booming, but little seemed to the shearers, labourers and sailors to be "trickling down" to them. Then around 1885 demand slackened off and with falling prices, the employers felt the need to reduce their labour force, and cut the wages of those who remained. The Maritime Labour Council (MLC) was formed in Adelaide in 1886 and the following year raised a Maritime Strike Fund of £9,600, of which various workers' unions subscribed around half. When the United Trades and Labour Council of South Australia needed money to start a workers' newspaper, the Port Adelaide Seamen's Union was quick to assist with an interest-free loan.

=== The Weekly Herald ===
A predecessor of The Herald was Our Commonwealth for which A. W. Rayment and Ignatius Singer wrote articles on Single Tax. Another, though later derided, was The Voice edited by John Medway Day (1838–1905) in 1892 for the Single Tax League. Labor Party organisers Devin Williams, John Abel McPherson, Henry and his brother George H. Buttery, and others, founded the Cooperative Printing and Publishing Company of S.A. Limited, with 30,000 shares of 10s., and merged with the company publishing The Voice. The Weekly Herald was founded in October 1894, edited by Geoff Burgoyne, later leader writer for Sir Winthrop Hackett's West Australian. George Wedd was editor from April 1895. He was later associated with the Sporting Life weekly. He was also secretary of the SA Athletics League, the Band Association of SA and Goodwood United Rifle Club.

=== The Herald ===
From the first issue in 1899 the publication was named The Herald, with uninterrupted numbering, and no other substantial change. Shortly after foundation, the paper's banner was subtitled "Labor and Democratic Organ of South Australia"; in 1896 "The Official Organ of the Labor and Democratic Parties of South Australia" and from 1897 "The Official Organ of the Trades and Labor Council, United Labor Party, and Democratic Societies of S.A.".

=== The Daily Herald ===
The Daily Herald was from 7 March 1910 published by the Cooperative Printing and Publishing Company of S.A. Limited, with offices at 117 Grenfell Street for the Labor Party.

William Wedd (9 January 1845 – 10 February 1922) was the first editor, with Geoffrey Burgoyne as associate editor. The first few weeks' issues were printed by The Register, as its own presses had teething problems. Wedd was forced by ill-health to retire after a year or two, but continued to contribute, as "Epsilon" and "Remus", to the Herald and other newspapers. Burgoyne, a son of T. Burgoyne M.P., was later with The West Australian, then in 1924 the founding editor of the Hobart News, daughter publication of the Adelaide News. In 1940, he was managing editor of the Perth News.

Editor from 1911 to 1912 and 1916 to 1924 was Harry Kneebone, Editor from 1912 to 1914 was Cam Pratt, a member of a family of journalists, who was next with the West Australian, followed by the Sydney Morning Herald, publicity department of Ford Australia then with Cinesound Productions and editor of the film journal. The editor from 1914 to 1916 was Labor politician E. H. Coombe. Julian Woods, previously with the Melbourne Telegraph and The Age, and the Perth Daily News, was a sub-editor 1913.

Harry Kneebone returned to the editor's chair in 1916, with the paper in decline. In 1910 the paper had 12 pages and cover price was 1d.; by 1924 it had 4 pages for 1½d and although the Advertiser was the same price it boasted 16 pages. The perceived poorer value resulted in a decreased circulation and reduced advertising revenue, and the paper's financial position, already shaky, became dire. A meeting of shareholders 23 June 1924 decided on immediate voluntary liquidation.

=== "Laradale" and Seth Ferry ===
Between 9 March 1918 and 1 February 1919 The Herald ran a weekly feature, instalments 1–35 bylined "Laradale" (William W. Goddard), based on interviews with, and unpublished memoirs of, Seth "The Master" Ferry, a major figure of the Adelaide turf scene for some 50 years. Chapters from #36 were not attributed, and may have been written by Ferry himself, and the series ended peremptorily at #46 with no explanation. Goddard successfully sued the Co-operative Printing and Publishing Company, publishers of The Daily Herald for withholding part of his wages. Goddard's accounts of details of his contract were refuted by The Herald.

== Printing ==
=== The Weekly Herald ===
Though some preliminary arrangements may have been made with C. W. Chandler, printing was first contracted out to Webb & Son of 28 Grenfell Street. In January 1896 the contract was changed to Scrymgour & Sons of King William Street. A fortnight later Ralph William Webb and Henry Arthur Webb petitioned for the winding up of the Co-operative Printing and Publishing Company, producers of The Herald, on the grounds of unpaid debts. From June 1896, Trades Hall had its own printing facilities.

=== The Daily Herald ===
Having decided to publish daily, it was necessary to upgrade the printing machinery. A rotary press would have been ideal, but the lead time for manufacture and shipping to Adelaide was too great, so they settled on a secondhand "Victory" web printing press, ex-Melbourne. A "state of the art" stereotyping plant and five Mergenthaler linotype compositing machines (four Model No. 1 duplex single-letter machines and one Model No. 4 machine) were sent out from the Broadheath, Greater Manchester factory, and were received eight weeks from placing the order.

=== Other work ===
From November 1913 printing of The Southern Cross went from Scrymgour & Son to the Co-operative Printing and Publishing Company.

== Digitisation ==
The National Library of Australia has digitised photographic copies as part of the Australian Newspapers Digitisation Project.
