= The Australian Worker =

Australian newspaper

Page 1 of The Australian Worker newspaper published Thursday 6 November 1913

The Australian Worker was a newspaper produced in Sydney, New South Wales for the Australian Workers' Union. It was published from 1890 to 1950.

== History ==
The newspaper had its origin in The Hummer, "Official organ of the Associated Riverina Workers", a newspaper produced in Wagga Wagga in the depths of the 1890s depression on 19 October 1891. The paper was jointly funded by the Wagga branches of the Amalgamated Shearers' Union of Australasia and the General Workers' Union, which merged in 1894 to form the Australian Workers' Union. The Hummer was the first union-owned newspaper in New South Wales (there was a privately owned pro-labor paper called The Shearers' Record published by Andrews and Taylor), and was born out of the perception that many or most mainstream newspaper proprietors and editors were sufficiently hostile to Unionism to suppress or mutilate letters and news items sympathetic to workers' rights, and to come down heavily on the side of business owners in any dispute. The men behind this bold move, which may have contravened the constitutions of the unions involved, were Wagga Branch officials Walter Head, Arthur Rae and J. J. Mooney. Later a share was sold to the Labor Electoral League. and the last issue 3 September 1892.

An arrangement was arrived at with a similar institution, The Worker, founded by William Lane in Brisbane in 1890, to share resources, and the resulting paper The Worker, "with which is incorporated The Hummer" in Wagga, associated with The Worker in Brisbane, Queensland began in Sydney on 24 September 1892, with each company supplying half the content of each issue.

Wagga Branch continued the publication of The Worker until March 1893, when six other N.S.W. Branches agreed to join in, and the plant was removed to either 1 Palmer Street Woolloomooloo or 217 Palmer Street, Sydney. James A. Ross was Manager and Walter Head and Arthur Rae performed most of the editorial work. From July 1893 the whole of the paper was printed in-house, the Queensland agreement having come to an end. J. Medway Day, of the South Australian Register and The Voice, was brought in as editor in 1894, and around this time Ross resigned as manager and Medway Day was obliged to take on that role as well. For the 1894 general election it was decided to issue The Worker daily during the campaign, so The Daily Worker was published for three weeks commencing 2 July 1894. This proved financially disastrous; a loss being incurred of almost £2,000, which the annual levy of 1s. per member was insufficient to meet.

By May 1896 it was realized that strong measures were called for and in June Hector Lamond took over management. From November 1896 publication went from weekly to fortnightly, then in February, 1897 ceased altogether. Publication resumed in a reduced size on 31 August 1897, operated by the Bourke Branch of the AWU and with artwork generously provided by its Queensland counterpart. Little by little its financial position became more secure, and The Worker emerged from the depression on a sound footing. They purchased The Australian Workman (1890–1897), which covered city workers, from its private owners. The plant moved to Castlereagh Street, Sydney and a new double-royal flatbed press.

William Lane was appointed editor in February 1900. In 1900 they moved to 311 Kent Street, Sydney, and a Cox-duplex flat-bed rotary press, capable of printing 5000 sheets per hour was installed.

In 1900 an agreement was reached where the paper was supported by a 2/6d annual levy on all members of New South Wales, Victoria and South Australia, with State representation on the board. A linotype machine was purchased in 1901, enabling the paper to be expanded to 6 pages, then 8 in 1902. In that year the member levy was increased to 5s., which enabled the employment of additional literary staff and the purchase of freehold property at 129 Bathurst Street, so the business was no longer at the mercy of the landlord. A second linotype was installed in 1904. A Hoe press was installed, and the first issue came out on 13 December 1907.

In 1913 the masthead changed from The Worker "An Australian Paper for Australian People" to The Australian Worker "An Australian Paper for Australian Homes". Managing editor was H. Lamond.

Henry. E. Boote became the editor in 1914.

Its circulation peaked in 1917, when Billy Hughes was running the conscription referendum; the Worker was solidly behind the 'No' case.

The newspaper next moved to a building on Kent Street (now St. Andrews Place) where it remained until its 1939 sale to the Church of England for occupation by St Andrew's Cathedral School.

Its final move was to the former Protestant Hall on Castlereagh Street, roughly opposite its old building. Tim Donovan retired and new manager Bob Browne was appointed.

== Staff and contributors ==
Cartoonists: 1907 Claude Marquet, followed by Will Donald, Pat Sullivan

Women's Pages:Mary Gilmore

Business manager: J. F. "Jack" Higgins

Editors: Walter Head, Arthur Rae, J. Medway Day, Hector Lamond, William Lane, George Mure Black (1854–1936), J. S. Hanlon, E. J. Brady, Henry E. Boote (1865–1949),

Sub-editors: Frank Barnes, William David "Jack" Heher (c. 1872 – 27 December 1951)

Writers and Journalists:

Albert Dorrington
J. F. Dwyer (1874–1952)
Rev. Albert Rivett (c. 1855–1934)
David McKee Wright
C. J. Dennis "Den"
Donald E. Fraser "Jimmy Pannikin" (c. 1863–1918)
E. S. Sorenson
Herbert Ingram Lowe
Howard Cole Coghlan
J. Harding Tucker "Nulla"
P. T. Freeman "Petifi" ( –1925)
Frederick John Broomfield (c. 1859–1941)
Walter Hegarty "Riverina" (c. 1867–1922)
Arthur Wright
Una Martha Kidgell
Ada Augusta Kidgell (married W. A. Holman)
Hugh Stone
W. Frank Ahern (c. 1884–1942)
R. J. Cassidy "Gilrooney" (1880–1948)
Roderic Quinn
Zora Cross (1890–1964)
Lola Gornall (1884–1969)
Frank Cotton
Steve O'Brien "Jack Shay"
Dowell O'Reilly
Mary Ellen Lloyd "Bay Ash", "Zadig"

== Digitisation ==
Most issues of The Hummer, The Worker, The Australian Workman and The Australian Worker from 5 March 1914 to 20 December 1950 are available on-line and accessible via Trove, a service of the Australian National Library.

The Hummer, which was published in Wagga is indexed by the Australian National Library as "The Hummer (Milsons Point, NSW : 1891–1892)" whereas The Worker, for almost its entire history produced in Sydney, is indexed as "The Worker (Wagga, NSW : 1892–1913)".
