= Bell's Life in Sydney and Sporting Reviewer =

Sydney based newspaper

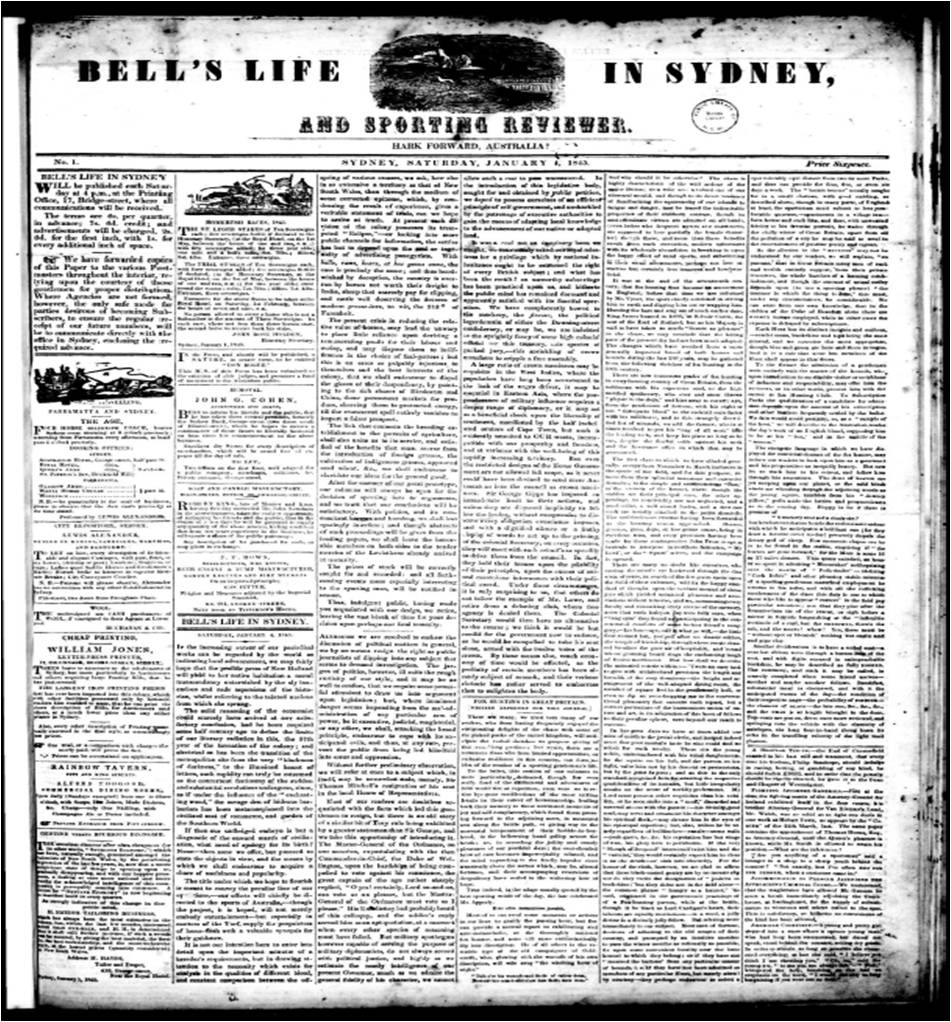
Bell's Life in Sydney & Sporting Reviewer, 4 January 1845

Bell's Life in Sydney and Sporting Reviewer, also published as Bell’s Life in Sydney and Sporting Chronicle, was a weekly English language newspaper published in Sydney, New South Wales, Australia between 1845 and 1870.

== History ==
The newspaper was first published on 4 January 1845 by Thomas Revel Johnson. He took on a business partner, George Ferrers Pickering, in 1847. However, Johnson left the company in 1848 and was succeeded by Charles Hamilton Nichols (the son of Isaac Nichols). Bell’s Life in Sydney and Sporting Reviewer was published from 1845 to 1860. The publication was continued as Bell’s Life in Sydney and Sporting Chronicle, which was published from 1860 to 1870.

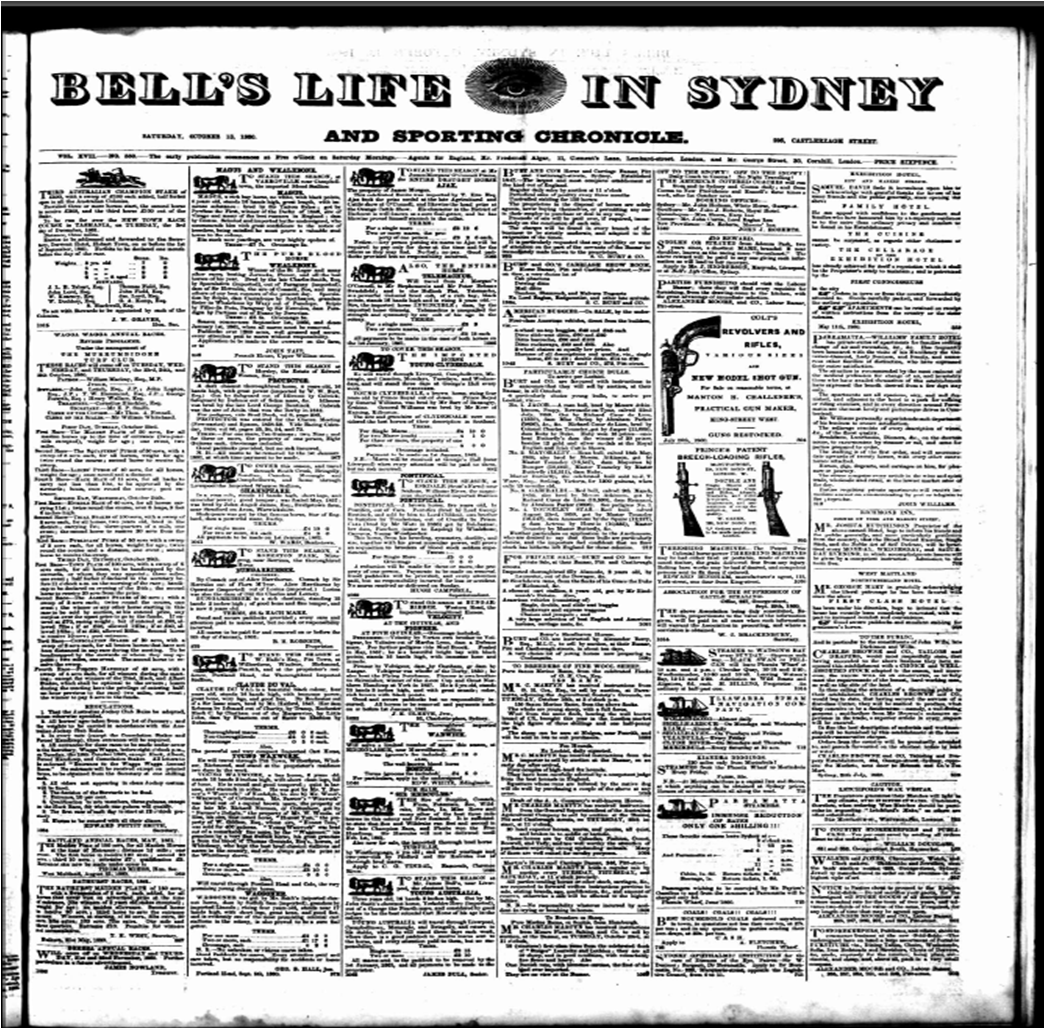
Bell's Life in Sydney & Sporting Chronicle

== Digitisation ==
The paper has been digitised as part of the Australian Newspapers Digitisation Program of the National Library of Australia.

== See also ==
- List of newspapers in Australia
- List of newspapers in New South Wales
- List of defunct newspapers of Australia
