= Euroa Gazette =

Australian newspaper

The Euroa Gazette is a newspaper published weekly in Euroa, Victoria, Australia.

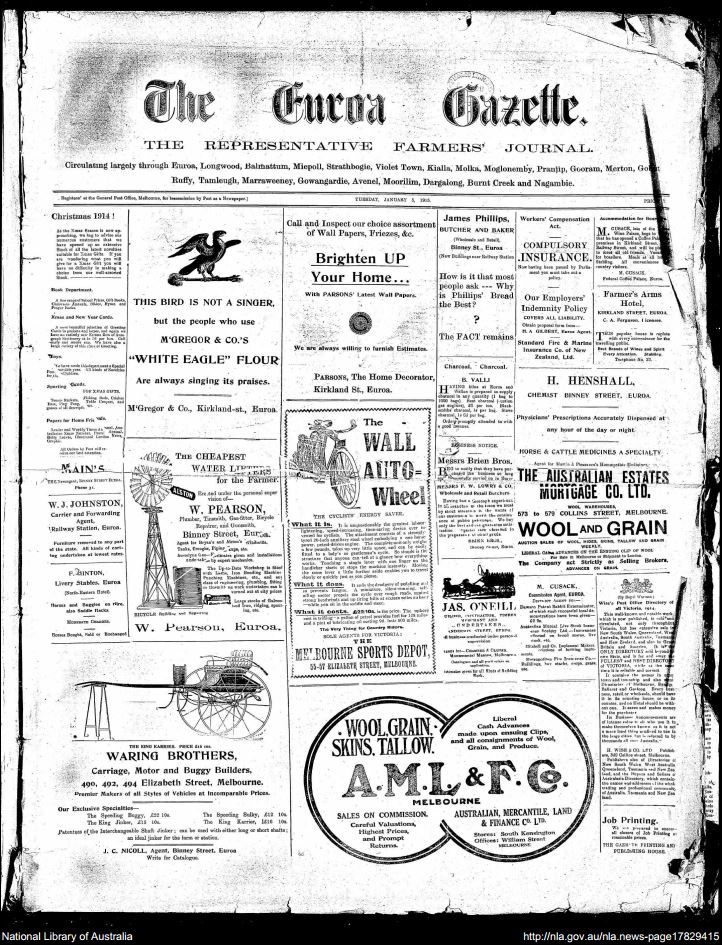
Front page of the Euroa Gazette, 5 January 1915

== History ==
The newspaper was first published on 23 November 1897 by H.A.Gilbert. It was a weekly publication for residents of Euroa, Longwood, Balmattum, Miepoll, Strathbogie, Violet Town, Kialla, Molka, Moglonemby, Pranjip, Gooram, Merton, Gobur, Ruffy, Tamleugh, Marraweeney, Gowangardie, Avenel, Moorilim, Dargalong, Burnt Creek and Nagambie.

In 1957, The Euroa Gazette absorbed the Euroa Advertiser and The Violet Town Sentinel.

Today The Euroa Gazette is published by North East Media, a division of Provincial Press Group Pty Ltd.

== Digitisation ==
The newspaper has been digitised as part of the Australian Newspapers Digitisation Program of the National Library of Australia.

== See also ==
- List of newspapers in Australia
