= The Children's Newspaper (Australia) =

The Children's Newspaper was a monthly English language newspaper published from 1899–1900 in New South Wales, Australia. It was also known as The Children's Newspaper: a monthly journal for young folks and The Australian Children's Newspaper.

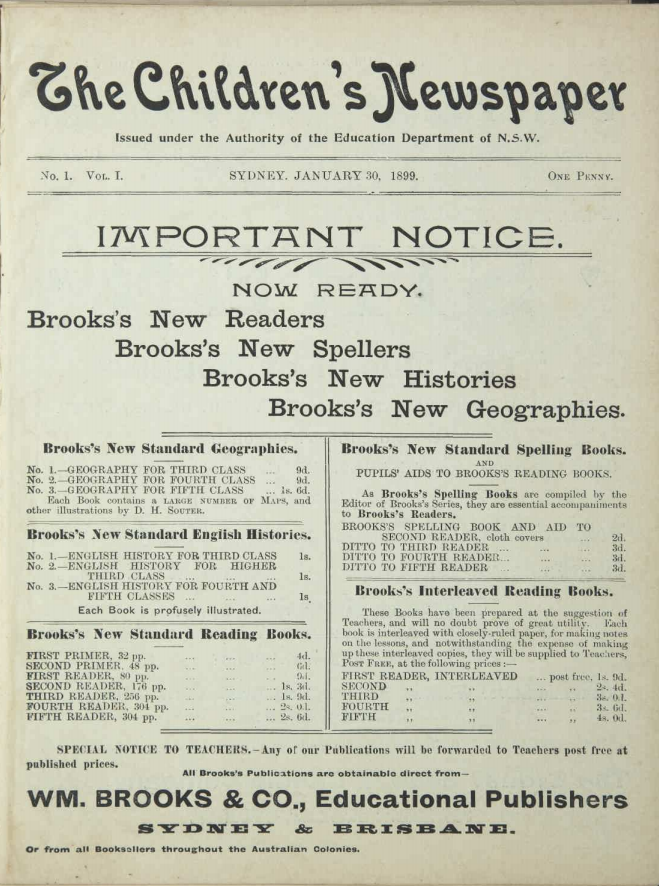
Cover page of The Children's Newspaper 30 January 1899

== History ==
First published on 30 January 1899, The Children's Newspaper continued for only one year, its last issue appearing on 28 January 1900. It was issued under the authority of the New South Wales Department of Education and published by W.M. Brooke & Co in Sydney.

In the last issue of the paper the editor states: "The Children's Newspaper has completed its trial year, and we have to announce to our numerous young readers that we cannot see our way to start another volume. The C.N. is only a comparatively small production, but small as it is, the tax on our editor's time has been too great, and even editors get wearied when they have too much work to do."

== Digitisation ==
The paper has been digitised as part of the Australian Newspapers Digitisation Program project of the National Library of Australia.

== See also ==
- List of newspapers in New South Wales
- List of newspapers in Australia
- List of defunct newspapers of Australia
