= The Charleville Times =

Former newspaper in Queensland, Australia

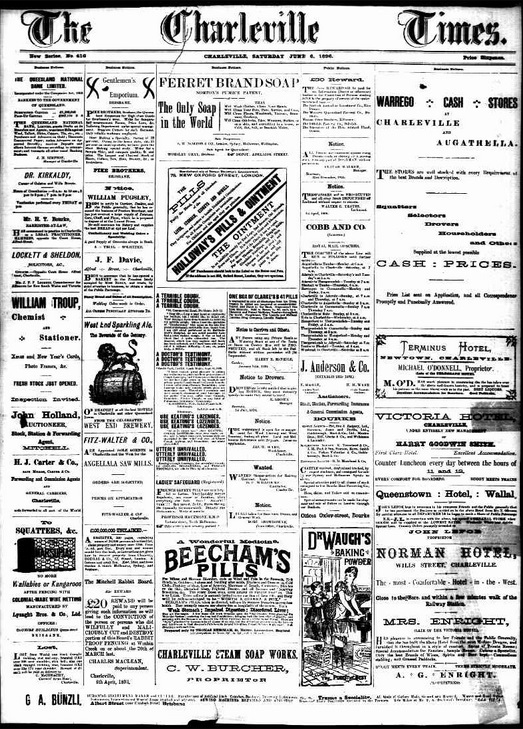
Front page of The Charleville Times, 6 June 1896.

The Charleville Times was a newspaper published in Charleville, Queensland, Australia, from 25 December 1883.

== History ==
The Charleville Times was printed and published by Richard Boyd Echlin for the Charleville times Printing Co. and was first published on 25 December 1883. In 1961 it absorbed the Maranoa News published in Mitchell. Later it became the Western Times.

== Digitisation ==
The paper has been digitised as part of the Australian Newspapers Digitisation Program of the National Library of Australia.

== See also ==
- List of newspapers in Australia
