= R. J. Cassidy =

Australian poet (1880–1948)

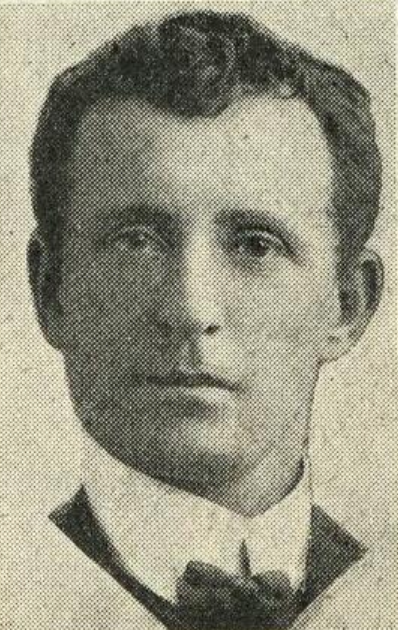
- Born: Robert John Cassidy; 1880; Coolac, New South Wales
- Died: 26 September 1948 (aged 67–68); Bondi Junction, New South Wales
- Occupation: poet
- Writing career
- Language: English
- Years active: 1902-1941

R. J. (Bob) Cassidy (1880–1948) was an Australian poet who was born in Coolac, New South Wales.

== Working life ==
After contributing poems and prose to a number of Sydney newspapers Cassidy joined the staff of The Australian Worker in 1908. He later left that paper for the Barrier Truth in Broken Hill, before finally returning to The Australian Worker in 1908. He wrote for the paper under his own name and under that of his major pseudonym, "Gilrooney".

Cassidy was one of the founding members of New South Wales Artists' and Writers' Association, which later joined forces with the Australian Journalists' Association in 1909.

Cassidy died on 26 September 1948 at his home in Bondi Junction and was buried in the Catholic section of Waverley Cemetery. His wife died in 1952.

== Bibliography ==
=== Novels ===
- Chandler of Corralinga (1912)

=== Collections ===
- The Land of the Starry Cross and Other Verses (1911) — poetry
- The Gypsy Road and Other Fancies (1919) — poetry and short stories
