= The Braidwood Dispatch and Mining Journal =

The Braidwood Dispatch and Mining Journal was an English language broadsheet newspaper published in Braidwood, New South Wales, Australia.

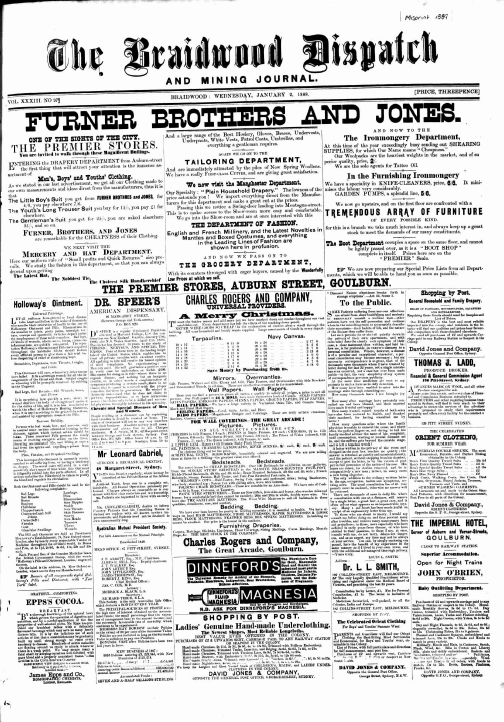
Cover page of The Braidwood Dispatch and Mining Journal, 2 January 1888

== History ==
First appearing on 10 April 1859, The Braidwood Dispatch and Mining Journal was published twice weekly from 1859 until January 1958. From 2 July 1915, it alternated with The Braidwood Review and District Advocate. The newspaper was on Wednesdays and Saturdays until June 1915 and then Tuesdays and Saturdays. In the early 1860s the newspaper was purchased by John Musgrave and Mr. J. Cosgrove. Musgrave later bought out his partner, remaining as sole publisher of the paper until his death on 21 August 1914.

In July 1912 the paper was one of the first to publish an account of the connection between the carbon dioxide generated by burning coal and global warming, after an article in Popular Mechanics.

== Digitisation ==
Many issues of the paper which appeared between 1888 and 1912 have been digitised as part of the Australian Newspapers Digitisation Program of the National Library of Australia.

== See also ==
- List of newspapers in Australia
- List of newspapers in New South Wales
- List of defunct newspapers of Australia
