= Evelyn Observer =

Former newspaper in Melbourne, Victoria

The Evelyn Observer was a weekly newspaper released from 1873 to 1942 in the north-east area of Melbourne, Victoria in Australia. It was first published on 31 October 1873 from a school house at Kangaroo Ground. Andrew Ross, the district's first school master and hotel-keeper was the Observer's first proprietor, and he enlisted the help of a printer, John Rossiter, who became the first editor. It then operated out of a dedicated building on the top of a hill. After the transfer of the newspaper office to Hurstbridge, the building was purchased by the Eltham Shire Council.

Alan Marshall in his Pioneers & Painters: One Hundred Years of Eltham and it's Shire, published in 1971, provides an earlier history where he reproduces handwritten memories of John Bell of Kangaroo Ground written in 1910: "Sometime in the 60s the Evelyn Observer Newspaper Co. was started by Mr Rossiter being Editor .. Mr. Harris, the present proprietor and Editor, bought the business and has carried the Newspaper on successfully. In the early days the printing and publishing was carried on in the old school residence which was situated on the Church ground but about 32 years ago Mr Donaldson erected the building which is now known as the Observer Office".

The earliest surviving issue is 15 October 1875, held at the State Library of Victoria.

From 7 July 1882, the newspaper circulated in Eltham, Lilydale, Heidelberg, Whittlesea, Yan Yean, Kangaroo Ground, Diamond Creek, Anderson's Creek, Alphington, Ivanhoe, Epping, Northcote, Preston, Yarra Flats, Morang, Yering, Caledonia, Healesville, Fernshaw, Marysville, Greensborough, Templestowe, Ringwood and Upper Yarra.

The newspaper covered the subjects of agriculture and mining as well as horticulture in later years. It was usually four pages long and cost between two and three pence. Robert Charles Harris became the proprietor and editor from 1885 and continued in this role until his death in 1921, four years after he relocated the newspaper to the new railway at Hurstbridge. While the newspaper continued under abridged titles of the Hurstbridge and then Eltham Advertiser, it was overtaken by other titles across the Diamond Valley and ceased publication in 1942.

== History ==
- Evelyn Observer and South and East Bourke Record 1882–1902
- Evelyn Observer and Bourke East Record 1902–1917
- Eltham and Whittlesea Shires Advertiser and Diamond Creek Valley Advocate 1917–1922
- The Advertiser 1922–1939
- Eltham and Whittlesea Shires Advertiser 1940–1942

== See also ==
- List of newspapers in Australia
