= The Chronicle (Canberra) =

- Type: Weekly newspaper
- Format: Compact
- Owner: Australian Community Media
- Founded: 16 September 1981
- Ceased publication: 7 April 2020
- Headquarters: Fyshwick, Australian Capital Territory
- Price: Free

The Chronicle was a free weekly community newspaper in Canberra, Australia. It was published by Australian Community Media from the Fyshwick headquarters of the Canberra Times and was funded through advertising. Its suspension of print publication was announced on 8 April 2020 by unrelated publication City News.

== Background ==
The Canberra Chronicle was announced as a 'new newspaper for Canberra' in August 1981, with the first issue available on 16 September that year. It was described as a free weekly suburban newspaper covering the local scene and complementing The Canberra Times through its same publisher, The Federal Capital Press of Australia Pty Ltd. Initially it had an editorial team of three people including Graham Cooke, but it has also been said to have started with only one staff member (separate to the Times). Founding editor Garry Raffaele has described the team as six advertising staff and an editor, and borrowing Times staff on Fridays. There was an original print run of 75,200, which by its tenth anniversary in September 1991, increased to more than 90,000 copies. The Chronicle, alongside The Times, moved headquarters from Braddon to a new building in Fyshwick in April 1987.

In 1988, The Chronicle was cleared by the Australian Press Council of a bias allegation regarding election candidate coverage.

The paper, alongside The Canberra Times, was sold by Fairfax Media to Kerry Stokes in 1989.

In 2014, the Queanbeyan City Council proposed withdrawing advertising funds from The Chronicle and other local papers, in lieu of publishing their own newsletter-style newspaper. The plan for a council-run paper was debated and did not win majority support and undertook no further action.

In the issue of 7 April 2020, the front page stated that it would not be published the following fortnights (14 April and 21 April) due to a short recess. It was planned that the next issue would be published on 28 April, but this did not occur. The Chronicle's planned publication suspension was covered in the unrelated City News, and was not published thereafter, making it the final issue.

== Title history ==
In early January 1990, The Chronicle split into Northside Chronicle and Southside Chronicle, then later added the Valley Chronicle in 1991 for concurrent publishing of the trio of titles. These covered news, events and sport specifically for the North, the South (Woden, Weston Creek and South Canberra) and Tuggeranong. These expanded with additions of the City Chronicle and Belconnen Chronicle in 1992, and Queanbeyan Chronicle from 1993. The Gungahlin Chronicle was added in 1995.

The subsequent Tuggeranong Chronicle was previously known as the Weston Creek-Woden Valley View, Valley View and the Valley Chronicle. Promotions in June 1993 highlighted the five editions (Northside, Southside, Belconnen, Tuggeranong and Queanbeyan) as covering the Canberra and Queanbeyan (including Jerrabomberra) market reaching over 111,000 homes from the following month.

These local versions including City Chronicle were merged into the main title in July 2014. The Queanbeyan Chronicle was merged with the Queanbeyan Age in August 2016, subject to titling changes.

Title	Approximate dates	Notes
Canberra Chronicle	Vol. 1, no. 1 (16 September 1981) - Vol. 7, no. 318 (5 July 1988)	First original titling
The Chronicle	Vol. 7, no. 319 (12 July 1988) - Vol. 8, no. 378 (19 December 1989)	Sometimes listed as Chronicle (Canberra ACT)
Northside Chronicle	Vol. 8, no. 379 (23 January 1990) - (29 July 2014)	Initial dual split, then concurrent with additional regional titles until 2014 merge.
Southside Chronicle	Vol. 8, no. 379 (23 January 1990) - (29 July 2014)	Initial dual split, then concurrent with additional regional titles until 2014 merge.
The Valley Chronicle	Vol. 8, no. 427 (15 January 1991) - Vol. 10, no. 490 (27 April 1992)	Concurrent and later merged in 1992.
The Tuggeranong Chronicle	Vol. 10, no. 491 (4 May 1992) - circa 2003	Merged concurrent title. Previously known as Weston Creek-Woden Valley View, Valley View and the Valley Chronicle.
The Belconnen Chronicle	Vol. 10, no. 493 (18 May 1992) - Vol. 24, no. 27 (1 July 2003)	Concurrent
The Queanbeyan Chronicle	Vol. 1, no. 1 (12 July 1993) - circa 2016	This was later subsumed by the Queanbeyan Age: incorporating The Chronicle Community News, possibly prior to 2019.
The Gungahlin Chronicle	Vol. 12, no. 25 (10 July 1995) - circa 2003	Concurrent
The City Chronicle	circa 2003 - 15 July 2014	Concurrent
The Chronicle: community news for Canberra and Queanbeyan	Vol. 19, no. 31 (5 August 2014) - (7 April 2020)	Merging of all other remaining titles in July 2014 (Northside, Southside and City).
