= Rushworth Chronicle and Goulburn Advertiser =

Australian newspaper (1886–1977)

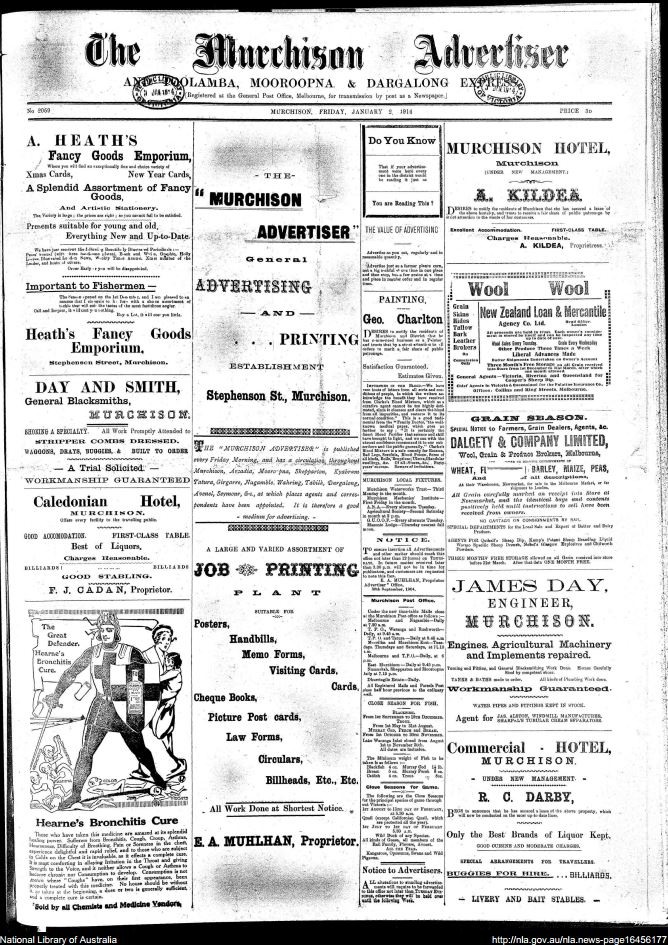
Front page of Murchison Advertiser, 2 January 1914

The Rushworth Chronicle and Goulburn Advertiser was an Australian newspaper that was published between 1886 and 1977.

The paper was published in Rushworth, Victoria by G.A. Beck for the Rushworth Printing Company, and was known as the "Official organ of the Shires of Waranga and Goulburn".

== History ==
Earlier titles of the paper include The Waranga Chronicle and Goulburn Advertiser, Murchison Advertiser and Murchison, Toolamba, Mooroopna & Dargalong Express, Goulburn Advertiser and Murchison, Toolamba, Mooroopna & Dargalong Express.

The Toolamba Telegraph and Moroopna, Shepparton, Arcadia, and Murchison Advertiser was launched by John Lewis in May 1874. The Waranga Echo was published in Rushworth from February 1868 until about August 1869. In 1869 Charles James Robinson launched the Waranga Chronicle. In 1886 The Waranga Chronicle was renamed the Rushworth Chronicle, and continued to be published under this name until 1977.

Charles Robinson launched the Goulburn Advertiser in 1873, which later became the Murchison Advertiser and ceased publication in 1962.

In 1876-77 John Lewis moved his printery from his farm into Mooroopna and changed the newspaper's title to the Mooroopna and Toolamba Telegraph, Shepparton, Rushworth and Murchison Advertiser. This was probably triggered by the emergence of the Shepparton News three months earlier.

There was a great deal of expansion in the Goulburn Valley in the 1880s, which caused newspaper publications to multiply.

John Lewis expanded his publishing business in 1880 launching the Tatura Guardian, and the Shepparton Chronicle.

== Digitisation ==
The paper has been digitised as part of the Australian Newspapers Digitisation Program of the National Library of Australia.

== See also ==
- List of newspapers in Australia
