= North Queensland Telegraph =

Late-19th century Australian newspaper

The North Queensland Telegraph was a short-lived late-19th-century Australian newspaper published in Townsville, Queensland.

== History ==
The newspaper was first published in 1885 as the North Queensland Telegraph and Territorial Separationist; it became the Northern Age and North Queensland Telegraph in 1889.

Publication ceased in 1891.
