= Elsternwick Leader =

Former newspaper in Victoria, Australia

The Elsternwick Leader was a weekly newspaper published from July 1887 until January 1902 in Elsternwick, Victoria, Australia. It was printed from the Leader office in Bay Street, Brighton.

== History ==
The Elsternwick Leader commenced on 16 July 1887. It was published every Saturday and initially consisted of four pages and cost one penny.

The paper was published under many different names. It commenced under the name Elsternwick Leader and East Brighton, South Brighton, Cheltenham, Mentone, Mordialloc, Oakleigh, Sandringham, Balaclava & Caulfield Record. However, it was only published under this title for the one edition, 16 July 1887, before the name changed to Elsternwick Leader and Caulfield and Balaclava Guardian. This name only lasted for two editions, 23 July and 30 July 1887. Further name changes followed until the 18 February 1888 when the Caulfield and Elsternwick Leader became the enduring title until the paper ceased on 4 January 1902.

The newspaper was initially published by R.Lemon and A.H. Richardson who also published many other newspapers including the Brighton Leader and Oakleigh Leader and District Record. The first issue of the Elsternwick Leader stated:

Very rapid improvements have been made in this rising locality, and are still in progress. To keep pace with this progress the proprietor of this journal has decided to publish a localised edition of the Leader in Elsternwick. We can assure our patrons and numerous readers in Elsternwick that no matter affecting its development and well being will be overlooked by us.

The newspaper was sold to T.M.Donaldson & Co. in February 1888, who continued to publish the newspaper until it ceased in 1902.

== See also ==
- List of newspapers in Australia
