= Army News =

Army News, front page, first issue, 26 October 1941

The Army News was a newspaper published in Darwin, Northern Territory, Australia during World War II between 1941 and 1946.

== History ==
It was published twice weekly from the first issue on 26 October 1941. By January 1942 it was published daily (including Sunday) and continued on that basis until September 1945 when the Sunday edition was dropped. The last issue was 1 January 1946.
