= Dunmunkle Standard =

Former newspaper in Victoria, Australia

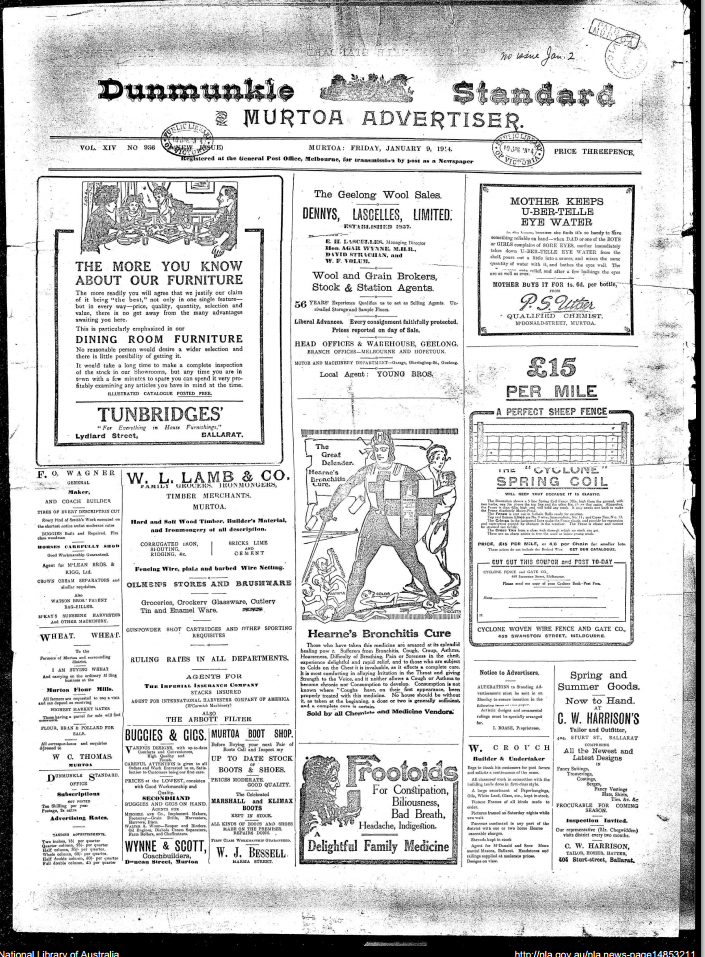
Dunmunkle Standard, 9 January 1914

The Dunmunkle Standard (1878–1974) was a weekly newspaper published in Murtoa, Victoria, Australia by E. Boase. The newspaper serviced the Shire of Dunmunkle and Murtoa. The newspaper was also known as the Dunmunkle Standard and Murtoa Advertiser.

== History ==
The Dunmunkle Standard was established in December 1878 by Edwin Boase (with assistance from Edward James Stephens). Boase continued to run the newspaper until his death in 1911. The paper continued to be managed and edited by P J Cummins after Boase'e widow took over proprietorship.

Mrs Boase sold the paper in 1828 to David O. Aubrey and James T. McKay. (McKay had worked for the Standard for 24 years.) The paper ceased publication after it failed to find a buyer in 1974.

Publication of the newspaper was suspended 4 April 1895 - 25 June 1896, and, 8 August 1959 - 14 March 1961.

== Digitisation ==
The Dunmunkle Standard has been digitised as part of the Australian Newspapers Digitisation Project of the National Library of Australia.

== See also ==
- List of newspapers in Australia
