= South Bourke and Mornington Journal =

Former newspaper in Victoria, Australia

- Publisher: H. Roulston
- Founded: 1865
- Country: Australia

The Dandenong Star Journal is a newspaper in south-eastern Melbourne, based in Dandenong. It was called the "South Bourke and Mornington Journal" from 1865 until 25 August 1927.

Initially published in Richmond, Victoria until 1920, it has since been published in Dandenong. The Journal was likely originally named for the state electorates of South Bourke and Mornington (the land south of the Yarra and west of Dandenong Creek, except for the city and inner south east; plus the Mornington Peninsula and Westernport Bay areas).

The paper was partially digitised as part of a World War I commemoration project. The digitised issues of the South Bourke and Mornington Journal are available on Trove with coverage from 10 January 1877 - 23 December 1920.

== Title history ==
Approximate dates	Titling
1865 – 1927	South Bourke and Mornington Journal
1927 – 1972	The Dandenong Journal
1972 – 1994	The Journal
1994 – 1997	Dandenong & District Journal (1994–97), Berwick & District Journal (1994–95), City of Casey Journal (1995–97)
1997	Dandenong & Casey Journal
1997 – 2010	The Journal
2010 – 2012	Greater Dandenong Weekly
2012 – 2017	Dandenong Journal
2017 –	Dandenong Star Journal, Endeavour Hills Doveton Hallam Star Journal
