= The Voice (Adelaide newspaper) =

The Voice was a short-lived weekly political newspaper published by J. Medway Day in Adelaide, South Australia from December 1892 to December 1893, and whose last issue was in August 1894.

The first issue was published on 9 December 1892, shortly after Medway Day left The Register.

The first number of The Voice, a paper published "in the cause of humanity* and edited by Mr J. Medway Day, was issued in Adelaide on Friday. The contents generally are of a solid character, although the heavier matter is introduced by a page of bright and chatty paragraphs, through which the personality of the writer is easily discernible. The new political force will discard the editorial "we", while it makes no claim to infallibility nor consistency which, it is stated, "as ordinarily understood is the last refuse of ignorance, bigotry, and feebleness". There are plentiful signs that the editor has decided opinions, especially with regard to the land question, and he affirms that, in this and other matters, there is to be "no surrender" and "no compromise". The platform of the paper is thus laid down :— "Those who know me best will not need to be told that prominence will be given to the land question in these columns. The land question is the labor question, and the latter will never be satisfactorily adjusted apart from the former. I may add that I am a free trader; but so long as we have private property in land there can be too true free trade, and whilst it is permitted, the workers receive no permanent benefit either from so called free-trade or protection. The land holder gets the advantage in either case." Among the contributed articles the most important, as it is the lengthiest, is that by Miss C. H. Spence on "Woman's Suffrage and Effective Voting". The paper is to be issued weekly at the price of 1d.

In December 1893 Medway Day accepted an offer to take over editorship of The Australian Worker, and left for Sydney in January 1894. A public company was formed to take over The Voice, but a meeting of shareholders on 28 August 1894 agreed to amalgamate with the about-to-be-formed S.A. Co-operative Newspaper Company, which would found The Weekly Herald. The last issue of The Voice was dated 31 August 1894.

Editorship of The Voice was taken over by Ernest John Hiscock (8 April 1868 – 16 December 1894). Hiscock was born at Roseworthy and grew up in Angaston and moved to Gawler at age 13. He was a noted cricketer, and died as a result of being struck in the abdomen by a cricket ball. He had married Florence Harriet Coltman just a few months earlier.

The Single Tax League acknowledged The Voice in furthering their cause.

== See also ==
- The Weekly Herald (Adelaide), for which The Voice may be considered a predecessor
