= The National Leader =

Newspaper in Brisbane, Queensland

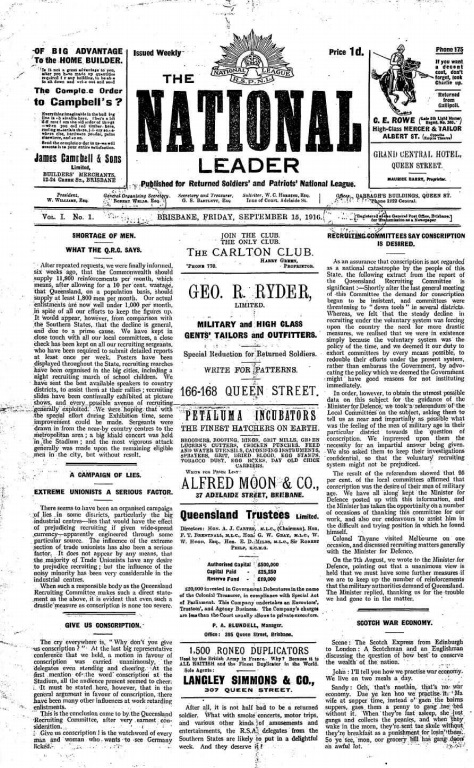
The front page of The National Leader published in Brisbane, Queensland.

The National Leader was a newspaper published in Brisbane, Queensland, Australia from 1916-1918. It changed its title to The Leader in 1918 and ceased publication in 1919.

== History ==
The National Leader (Brisbane, QLD) was a weekly newspaper published by the Brisbane chapter of the Returned Soldiers and Patriots' National League from 15 September 1916 to 13 December 1918. From 20 December 1918 the title changed to The Leader: the soldiers' paper (Brisbane, QLD) and was published monthly by the Returned Soldiers & Citizens Political Federation (Queensland Division). The publication ceased in December 1919.

== Digitisation ==
The paper has been digitised as part of the Australian Newspapers Digitisation Program of the National Library of Australia with support from the State Library of Queensland.

== See also ==
- List of newspapers in Australia
