= Queensland Telegraph =

The Queensland Telegraph was a short-lived weekly newspaper published in Rockhampton, Queensland by Queensland Media Holdings.

The Queensland Telegraph was published from June 2012 until July 2013 and was the second of three newspapers launched by Queensland Media Holdings across the state with "Telegraph" branding. It followed the launch of the Mackay Telegraph in Mackay and preceded the launch of the Toowoomba Telegraph in Toowoomba. Unlike the newspapers in Mackay and Toowoomba, only the state of Queensland was mentioned in the masthead, with no specific reference to a city or region, despite it being a newspaper focusing on local news and issues in Central Queensland.

The first issue of the Queensland Telegraph was released on 23 June 2012 and similar to the first issue of the Mackay Telegraph, it included congratulatory letters from federal and state politicians including Julia Gillard, Tony Abbott, Campbell Newman, Annastacia Palaszczuk, Kirsten Livermore, Bill Byrne and Bruce Young.

Although the newspaper was delivered free to most local households, it was also available for $1 from selected newsagencies. The newspaper stated that a percentage from sales would be put into a "Queensland Telegraph Community Fund" to be distributed amongst local community and sporting organisations.

The newspaper employed 12 staff in Rockhampton including editor Darryn Nufer, deputy editor Aaron Kelly, general manager Neil Williams, journalist Guy Williams, photojournalist Emily Powell, account managers Sarah Oehlert and Christie Ford, circulation manager Sherrie Austin, graphic designer Kerry Krapket, intern Rachael Conaghan, trainee Zoe Ball and administration officer Sue Richardson.

Apart from news articles, regular features of the Queensland Telegraph included Gladstone Glance, About Town, Scene Out, Motoring Max, On the Punt, Fishing CQ, Action AK.

As Queensland Media Holdings began to battle financial difficulties, it ceased publishing hard copies of the Queensland Telegraph and an attempt was made to transform it into an online-only newspaper.

All three "Telegraph" newspapers closed in July 2013 after Queensland Media Holdings had accrued a debt of $5 million, forcing the company into liquidation.
