= Mornington Standard =

Former newspaper in Victoria, Australia

The Mornington Standard was a weekly newspaper, circulating in the Frankston, Mornington, Dromana and Somerville areas of Victoria, Australia from 1889 to 1939. Usually four pages in length, the Mornington Standard covered news from all towns on the Mornington Peninsula. It contained a mix of local news, reports of the proceedings of local councils, churches, schools, the police courts and local sport.

== History ==
The Mornington Standard was founded on 5 October 1889 by Robert Ewins, but had little success, and went through a series of owners. On 7 March 1895 its masthead first proclaimed "Incorporating Mentone and Moorabbin Chronicle". From 1903 to 1905 it was owned by prominent local media entrepreneur Henry James Richmond. In July 1905 Henry's son William took over ownership of the Standard from his father.

It was renamed the Mornington and Dromana Standard on 11 July 1908, bearing issue number 1021, thus acknowledging its 1889 startup. The last issue with this banner was 4 March 1911 shortly after being taken over by William Wilson Young (c. 1851 – 1946), who had considerable experience with regional newspapers. The title reverted to Mornington Standard on 11 March 1911 as issue 1154. The business prospered under his management, and during war years and immediately after, there was a surge in demand for local news. In 1919 his eldest son, William Crawford Young, took over management of the business. In 1924 the office and print shop moved to Wells Street, Frankston, and in 1925 W. C. Young floated a company, Standard Newspapers Pty. Ltd. to build the business. He died 17 September 1928, but his family retained an interest in the company.

=== Frankston & Somerville Standard ===
From 11 July 1908, two editions of the newspaper were produced, the Mornington and Dromana Standard and the Frankston & Somerville Standard, which became separate newspapers on 7 January 1921 and whose last issues were dated 5 May 1939.

=== Consolidation ===
The Mornington Standard and Frankston & Somerville Standard continued as separate entities until 5 May 1939, when they were amalgamated into the Standard on 12 May 1939, the masthead later carrying the subtitle "Peninsula News-Pictorial", and as such continued until 28 July 1949, when it became the Frankston Standard, ceasing publication in December 1949.

=== Standard Newspapers Ltd. ===
The Standard's publisher from 1925 to 1933 was Arnold Leslie Aitken. In 1949 it was David Bowman JP, followed by Charles Dudman Fox in 1934.

Around 1929 the company's head office moved from Wells Street, Frankston to 10–12 Park Road, Cheltenham. Standard Newspapers Ltd. was still in existence in 1956, and may have been taken over by the owners of The Argus, as all later advertisements were carried by that newspaper.

== See also ==
- Australian newspapers
