= Gippsland Farmers Journal =

The Gippsland Farmers Journal was first published on January 27, 1887. The original masthead read as The Gippsland Farmers' Journal and Traralgon, Heyfield and Rosedale News. Originally published as a weekly, by July 1887, it was being published twice per week. The proprietor and publisher was Thomas Allard Pettit who sold the newspaper on 1 January 1904 to Mr.W. Chappell. Often referred to as the Journal or the Traralgon Journal, the paper's name was formally changed to the Traralgon Journal in 1923. In 1932, it merged with the Traralgon Record, Traralgon's first newspaper, to become the Traralgon Journal and Record.
