= The Logan and Albert Advocate =

Weekly newspaper in Australia from 1890 to 1908

The Logan and Albert Advocate was a weekly English language newspaper from Tamborine, Queensland, Australia. The newspaper was published from 1890 to 1908.

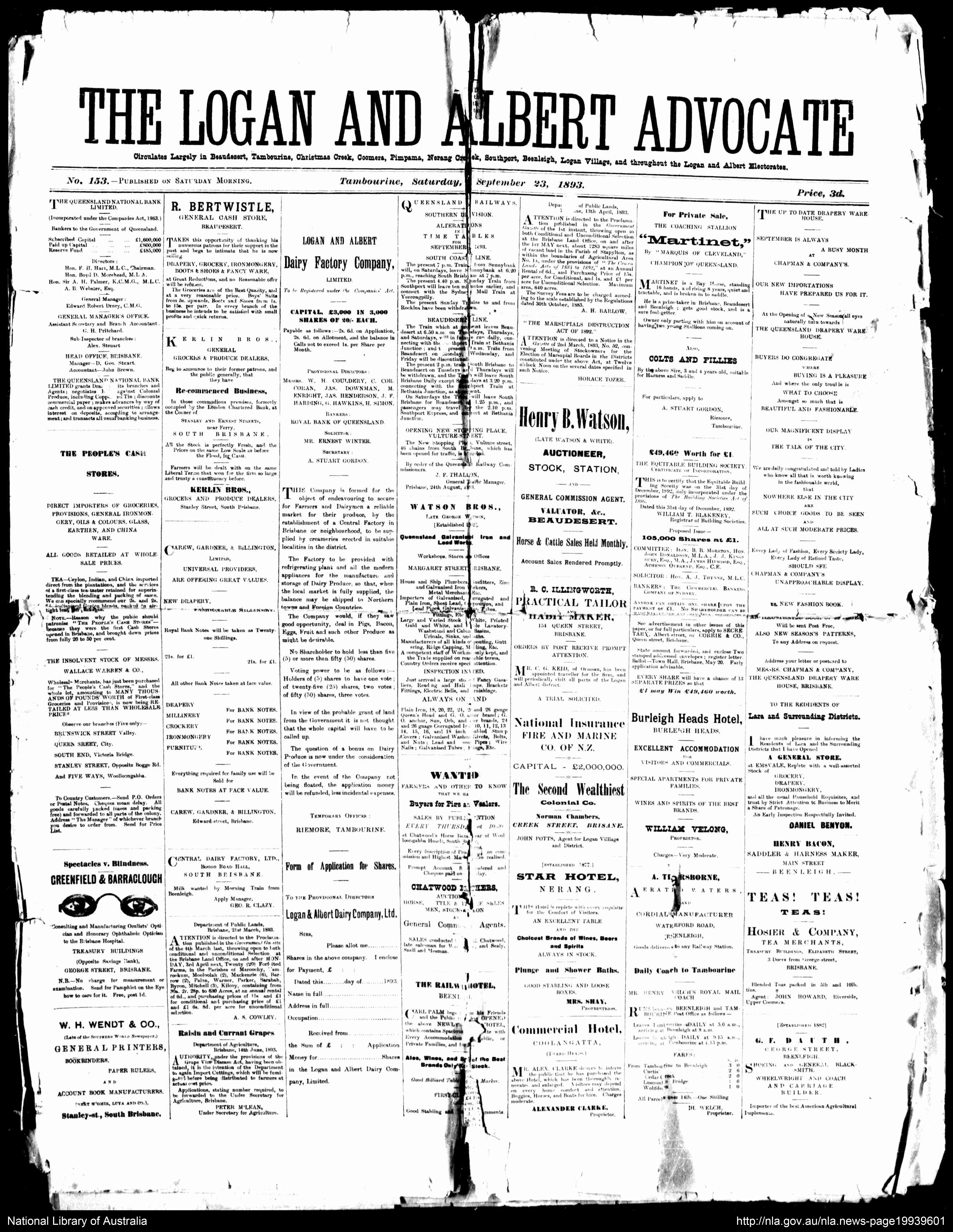
Page image from the National Library of Australia's Newspaper Digitisation Program.

== History ==
Issued on a Saturday, The Logan and Albert Advocate circulated in the regions of Beaudesert, Tamborine, Christmas Creek, Coomera, Pimpama, Nerang Creek, Southport, Beenleigh, Logan Village and throughout the Logan and Albert electorates. The Logan and Albert Advocate was launched at Tamborine on 18 October 1890 and was one of the first newspapers to circulate in the Beaudesert district. The newspaper was printed by W.H. Wendt and Co. for the proprietor Edwin. H. Wildman and was published at the city office of The Logan and Albert Advocate, Stanley Street, South Brisbane, later moving to the corner of Edward and Elizabeth Streets, Brisbane City. The Logan and Albert Advocate enjoyed a large circulation in the Beaudesert district. The newspaper ceased publication in 1908.

== Digitisation ==
The paper has been digitised as part of the Australian Newspapers Digitisation Program of the National Library of Australia.

== See also ==
- List of newspapers in Australia
