= Melbourne Express =

Former free newspaper in Melbourne, Victoria

- Type: Daily weekday newspaper
- Owner: Fairfax Media
- Founded: February 5, 2001; 25 years ago
- Ceased publication: September 7, 2001; 24 years ago
- Website: themelbourneexpress.com

Melbourne Express was a free newspaper distributed on weekday mornings at railway stations in Melbourne, Australia. It was published by Fairfax Media.

== History ==
Melbourne Express was launched on 5 February 2001. A day earlier, mX, another free newspaper also aimed at commuters that was distributed in the evenings, was launched by News Corporation.

Melbourne Express ceased publication on the 7 September 2001, just seven months after its initial foundation. The final edition featured a single frontpage headline stating "Goodbye, and thanks for all the fish" with short explanation explaining the reason for the decision.

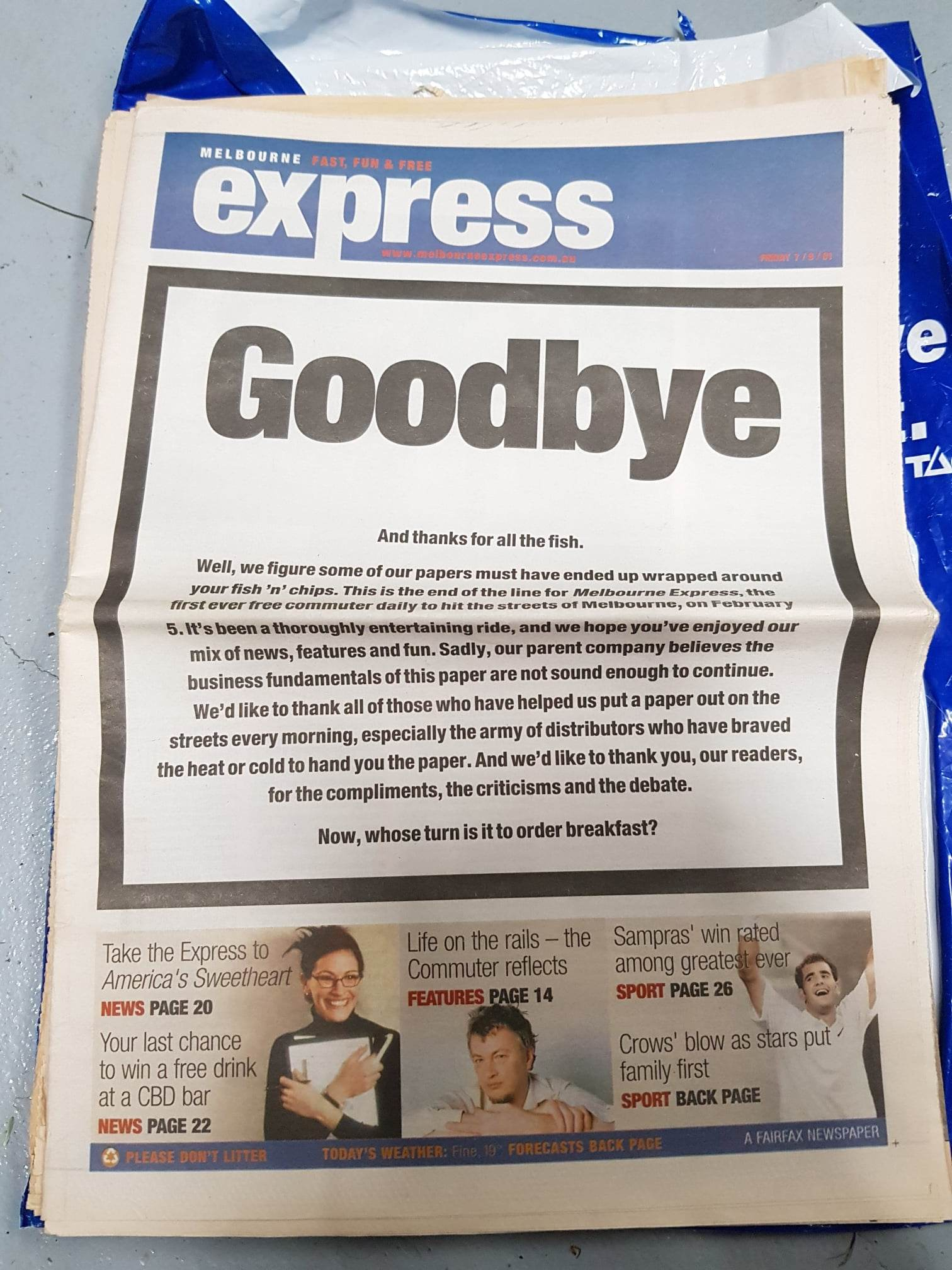
