= Maranoa News =

Former newspaper of Queensland, Australia

The Maranoa News was a newspaper published in Mitchell, Queensland, Australia.

== History ==
The newspaper was first published 1 July 1932. It continued until 29 June 1955.

Frederick William Osborne (Ossie) Rahmann was proprietor and editor from 1932 until his death aged 41 in 1947.

In 1950, it became part of the new Beacon Company, owners of the Balonne Beacon.

The Balonne Beacon reported on 30 June 1955 that the Maranoa News had "temporarily been forced to cease production" due to the "drastic staff position existing at the present time. The headline of the Beacon's next edition added the words "incorporating the 'Maranoa News' of Mitchell".
