= Broadford Courier =

Former newspaper in Victoria, Australia

- Founded: 1891
- Ceased publication: 1978
- Headquarters: Broadford, Victoria; Australia

The Broadford Courier was a weekly newspaper published in the town of Broadford, Victoria, Australia between 1891 and 1978.

Founded by J. M. Harcourt of Bendigo, its first issue was published on 28 February 1891 under the name Broadford Courier and Reedy Creek Times. On 3 August 1894 J. E. Fenton became editor of the newspaper, a role he held for ten years. In 1904 William McDonald bought the paper and property from the widow of J. M. Harcourt. McDonald, who was twelve when he started working in the printing office now became owner, editor and publisher.

The McDonald family's connection with the paper continued up until the late 1970s. Eric McDonald took over the Courier in 1958 after having worked in the office for over forty years. In the early 1970s Eric and his brother George were able to turn out between 300 and 400 copies a week at the 83-year-old printery. It has been confirmed that in the 1970s, the Courier's was the only hand-set hand-operated press in Victoria. The issue for 15 December 1978 was the last, and it was then incorporated by the Kilmore Free Press.

== See also ==
- List of newspapers in Australia
