= Yr Australydd =

Welsh language periodical; published in Australia

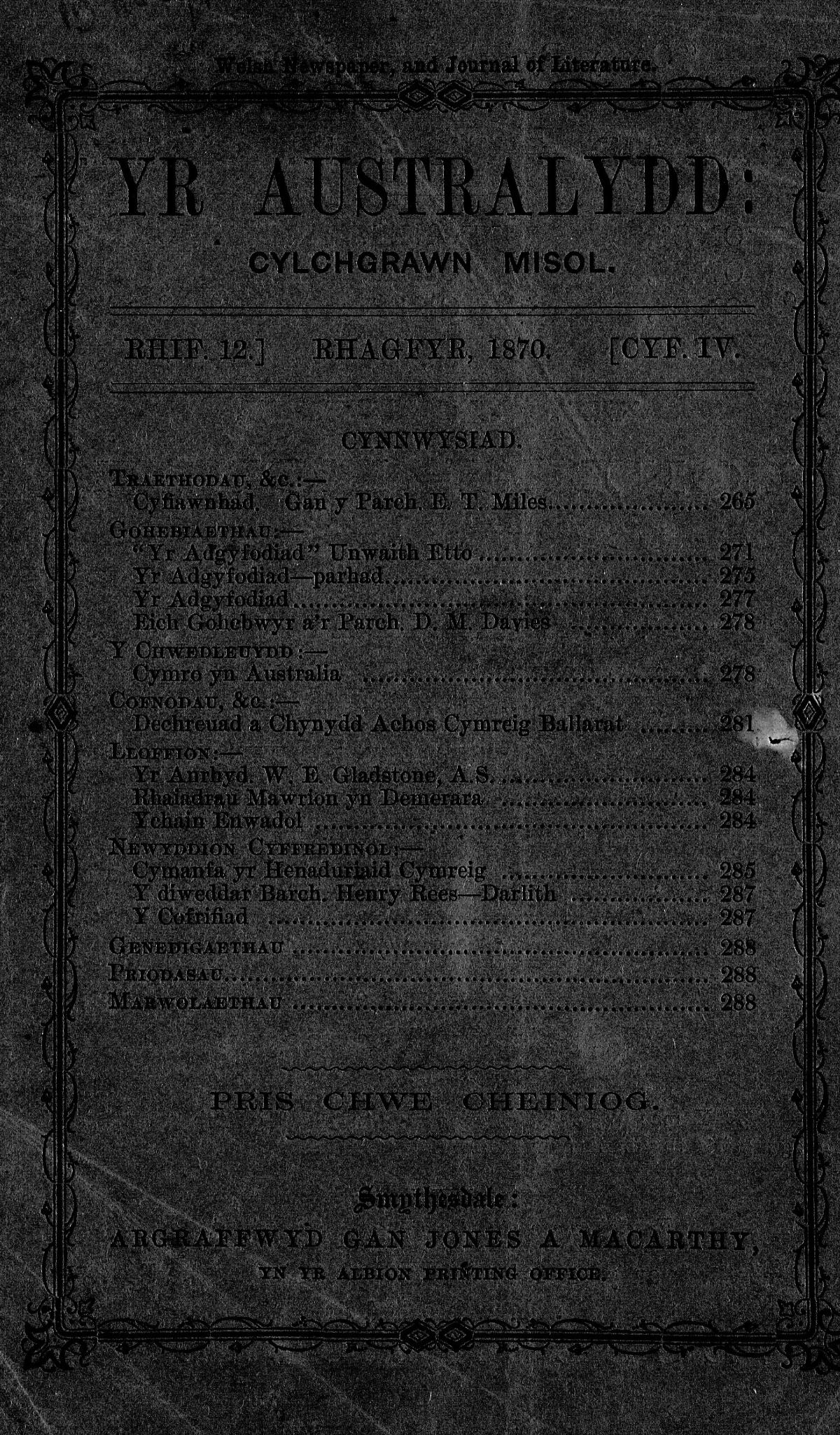
- Type: Monthly
- Founded: 1866
- Ceased publication: 1872
- Language: Welsh
- Headquarters: Victoria (Australia)
- OCLC number: 220221222

Yr Australydd was an Australian monthly newspaper in the Welsh language published in Victoria between 1866 and 1872. Its name translates as The Australian.

The newspaper was edited by Rev. William Meirion Evans and Theophilus Williams, and priced at 6d per issue. Its precise circulation is unknown, but estimated at several hundred.

Yr Australydd's intended readership were, obviously, Welsh Australians. It was more specifically linked to the Welsh Calvinistic Methodist community, and devoted between a sixth and a quarter of its content to theological writing. The newspaper's aim was also to encourage a sense of Welshness among its readers, by maintaining the language and promoting Welsh culture and literature. In its inaugural edition, editors explained that their objective was to "gwasanaethu ein cenedl mewn llenyddiaeth, moesoldeb a chrefydd" ("serve our nation in literature, morality and religion"). They requested and printed literary contributions from readers: poetry and short stories, as well as a serialised novel, Cymro yn Awstralia (A Welshman in Australia, 1870).

The newspaper also printed news from Wales in small quantity, accounting for about 3% of its content overall.

Publication began in Ballarat, was transferred to Melbourne in April 1871, and ceased in 1872, for reasons which remain unclear. In 1874, it was replaced by Yr Ymwelydd, a similar newspaper edited by Rev. Evans.
