= Ararat Chronicle and Willaura and Lake Bolac Districts Recorder =

Ararat Chronicle and Willaura and Lake Bolac Districts Recorder was a newspaper published in Ararat, Victoria, Australia from 23 January 1909 until c. 1925.

Issues from 1914 to 1918 have been digitised and are available on Trove.
