= The Graphic of Australia =

Former newspaper in Melbourne, Victoria

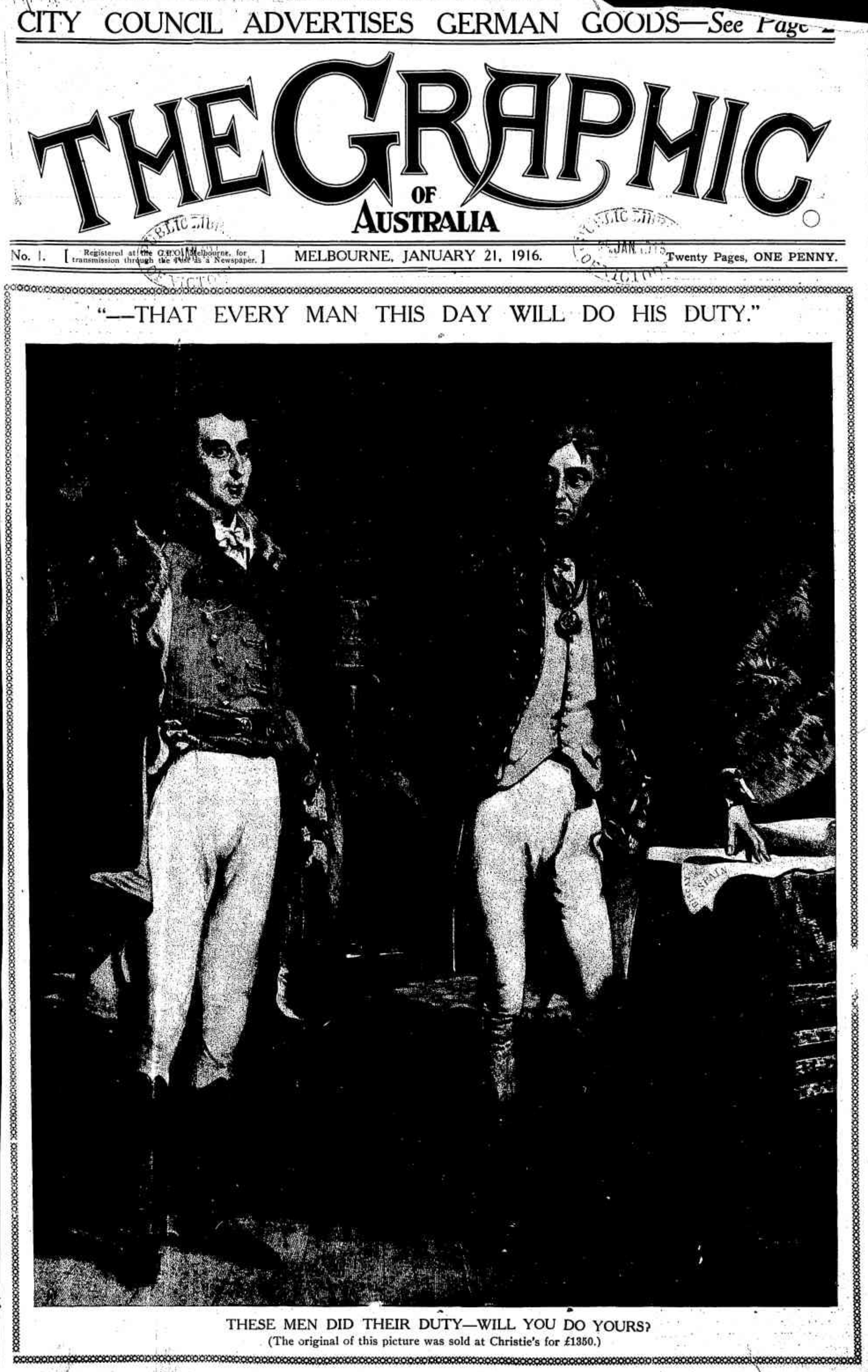
- Front page of first edition of The Graphic of Australia, published January 21, 1916
- Type: Daily newspaper
- Format: Broadsheet
- Founder: William Sydney McDermott
- Founded: January 21, 1916
- Language: English
- Headquarters: 25 Tattersall's Lane, Melbourne
- Country: Australia

The Graphic of Australia was a weekly newspaper first published in Melbourne on January 21, 1916, with a cover price of one penny. Publication continued, until issue number 106 on December 31, 1918. It was printed by Mitchell & Casey, and published by William Sydney McDermott at 25 Tattersall's Lane, Melbourne. Digitised issues are available at Trove.
