= Dayboro Times and Moreton Mail =

Australian newspaper

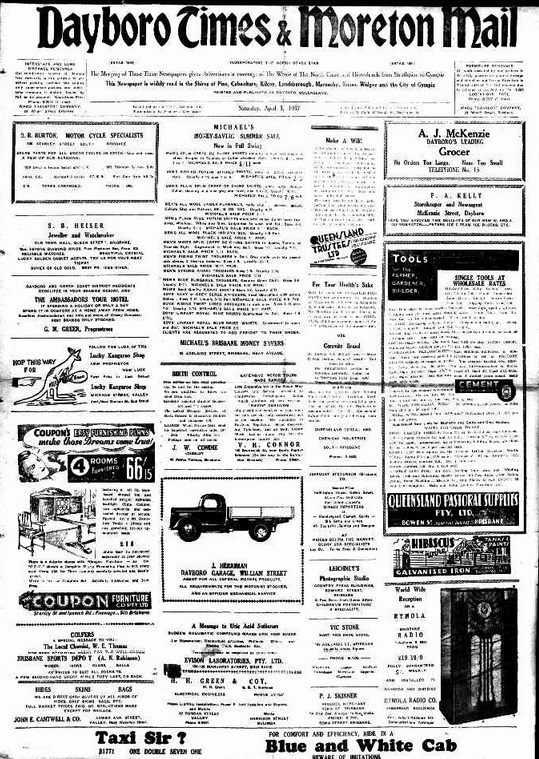
Front page of the Dayboro Times and Moreton Mail, 3 April 1954.

Dayboro Times and Moreton Mail was a weekly English language newspaper published in Dayboro, Queensland, Australia.

== History ==
Moreton Mail was established in 1886 in Brisbane by Charles Gill. In 1937 the Dayboro Times merged with the Moreton Mail to form the Dayboro Times and Moreton Mail.

Dayboro Times and Moreton Mail incorporating North Coast Star was a weekly English language newspaper published by the William M. Cook, Dayboro, Queensland, Australia and established in 1888.

In 1937 it claimed a readership in the shires of Pine, Caboolture, Kilcoy, Landsborough, Maroochy, Noosa, Widgee and the City of Gympie. Later issues claimed a readership in Bald Hills, Strathpine, Lawnton, Petrie, Dayboro, Mt Mee, Caboolture, Woodford, Samsonvale and Camp Mountain. As of 14 April 1945, the paper was printed and published by: Publication Printers, 41 Bowen Street, Brisbane, for Proprietor, W.M. Cook, Newmarket St., Hendra. Later issues published: Nundah, Qld. : Express Newspapers and were published monthly from 1961. The publication ceased in February 1981.

== Digitisation ==
The paper has been digitised as part of the Australian Newspapers Digitisation Program of the National Library of Australia with support from the State Library of Queensland and the Moreton Bay Regional Council.

== See also ==
- List of newspapers in Australia
