= Euroa Advertiser =

Former weekly newspaper in Victoria, Australia

The Euroa Advertiser was a weekly newspaper first printed and published by John West in March 1884. It was located in Euroa, a town in Victoria, Australia.

From 1 March 1884 to 18 July 1884, the paper was known as the Euroa Advertiser and Violet Town, Longwood, Avenel, Strathbogie, Balmattum and Miepoll Gazette. The paper ceased in 1957, and merged with the Euroa Gazette.
