= Grenville Advocate =

The Grenville Advocate was a newspaper that served Scarsdale, Victoria, Australia, in the latter half of the 19th century.

== History ==
The newspaper was established by the printer Johann Hermann Vogt who, along with his wife Maria Elisabeth (née Kellner, a former opera singer) and family, arrived in Melbourne, Australia, on the Marco Polo on 6 December 1856. The family lived at Kew before later settling in the Scarsdale district.

The journalist and editor George Leonard Vogt (1848–1937) also worked on the Grenville Advocate. The son of Johann and Maria, he was born on 1 November 1848 at Frankfurt am Main, Germany. Upon the death of his father in 1864, George was apprenticed to a Ballarat printer. From there he developed a deep interest in political reform movements.

== Archives ==
Microfilm copies of the Grenville Advocate held at the State Library of Victoria span 12 March 1862 to 4 December 1875.

Microfilms for the period 1872 to 1890 are also a part of the newspaper collection preserved by the Woady Yaloak Historical Society in Smythesdale.

== See also ==
- List of newspapers in Australia
