= Cooktown Independent =

The Cooktown Independent was a newspaper published in Cooktown, Queensland, Australia.

== History ==
The Cooktown Independent was first published in Cooktown on 6 June 1884 by James Fowler for Cooktown Independent Newspaper Company. In 1937, it became the Cooktown Independent and Northern Sun. From November 1939 to 1947, it was published in Mossman under the title Northern Boomerang.

In November 1947, Brian Keighley Gerardy (also known as Brian Keighley-Gerardy) purchased the printing plant to relocate to Murgon to establish the Murgon Advertiser.

== See also ==
- List of newspapers in Australia
