= MX (newspaper) =

Former free newspaper in Australia

mX
- Type: Free daily newspaper
- Format: Tabloid
- Owner: News Corp Australia
- Publisher: Tamara Oppen
- Editor: Melbourne: Craig Herbert; Sydney: Melissa Matheson; Brisbane: Emma Wardill
- Founded: 6 February 2001
- Ceased publication: 12 June 2015
- Headquarters: Melbourne, Australia
- Website: www.mx.net.au

mX was an Australian free afternoon daily newspaper in the cities of Melbourne, Sydney and Brisbane, owned and produced by News Corp Australia. Targeted at commuters, its main channels of distribution were inner-city railway stations, tram and bus stops, and major CBD intersections. The last edition of mX was published on 12 June 2015.

== Beginnings ==
The first mX was published in Melbourne on 6 February 2001, hoping to capitalise on the Metro format, popular in Europe. The paper contained lighter news and sports articles, often containing strange stories and facts from around the world (under the headings "Nice One" and, "What The?"). The newspaper's approach was to focus much more on entertainment than news, compared to broadsheet newspapers, or even other tabloids.

Melbourne Express, published by rival Fairfax Media, was this paper's competitor. Initially it used the same format, although it was released in the mornings rather than the afternoon. It began publication the day before mX, but was soon overtaken due to mX's much broader use of colour, its greater availability, and its lighter tone. In addition, mX had no explanation at its launch, allowing readers to assume that it stood for "Melbourne Express" and that it was the paper known by that name. Melbourne Express ceased publication on 7 September 2001.

The broad success of mX contributed to reduced sales of the afternoon edition of News Corporation stablemate the Herald Sun, its last edition being published on 21 December 2001.

== Sydney and Brisbane editions ==
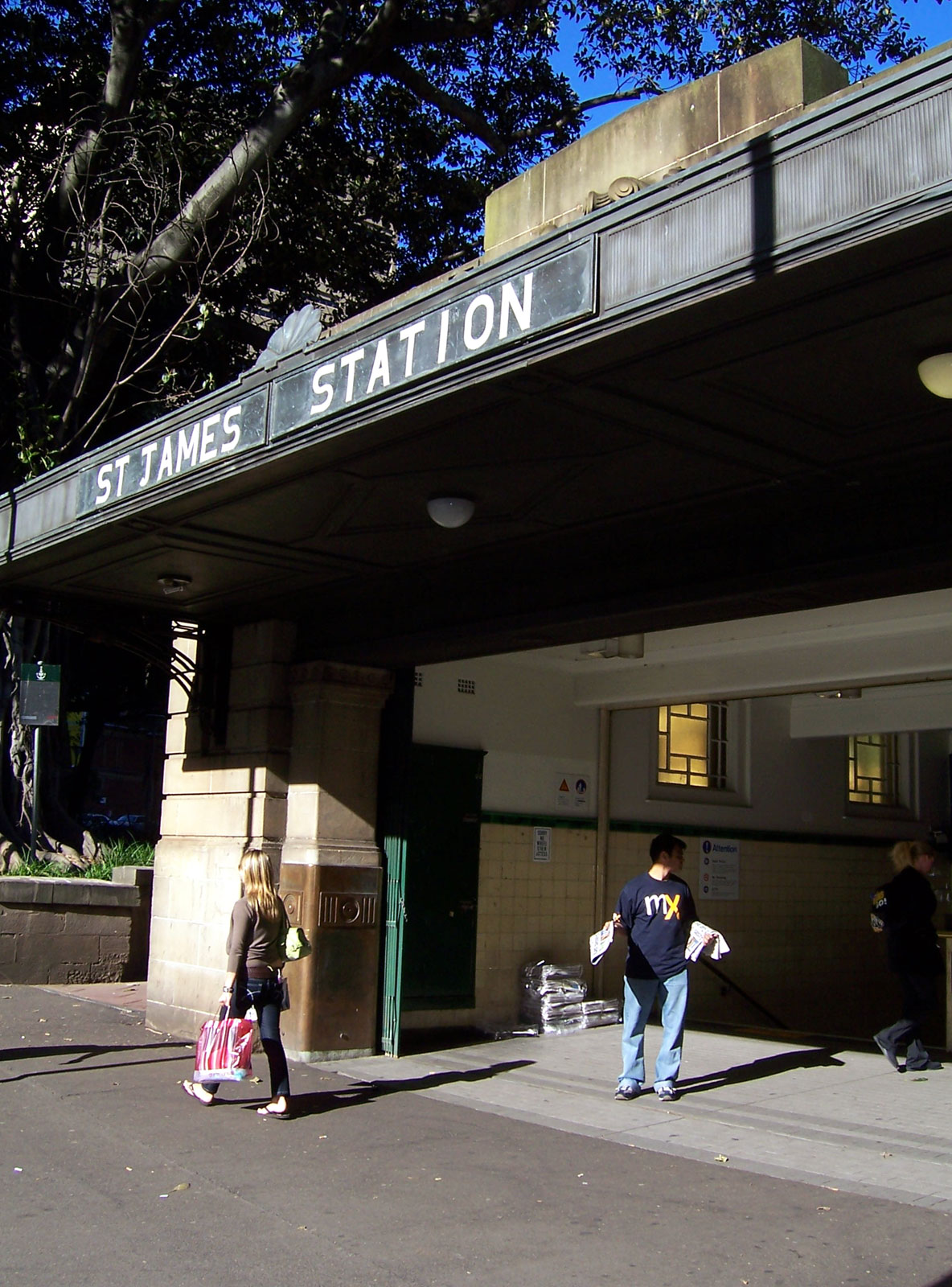
A person hands out copies of mX at St James railway station, Sydney

Following the success of mX in Melbourne, Sydney and Brisbane editions were launched.

On 4 July 2005, mX launched a Sydney edition. Sydney City Council was considering a tender to lease Sydney footpaths to News Corporation for $362,000 annually, and charge other free daily newspaper a similar fee if they use the same location more than 40 times a year. Other newspapers, that are distributed by sellers on streets, are concerned about the possibility that they may be required to also pay such fees.

The Brisbane edition of mX was launched on 5 March 2007, with an expected distribution of 40,000 copies per day.

== Format and content ==
Being a commuter newspaper, mX was much thinner than other daily newspapers.

Central themes of most articles included U.S. celebrity gossip, new product lines, controversial events, rumours, celebrity trivia, and readers' gripes, amongst other attention-grabbing stories. Large photographs often appeared without any related story, only a caption describing their contents; conversely, news stories were rarely accompanied by photographs. Small, large, and full page advertisements were also a major contributor to the paper's overall make-up.

The newspaper launched an app in 2013.

== Sections ==
- News – Short items of "legitimate" news such as national and state politics, included the next day's weather forecast. Started on page 2.
- Juice – Celebrity gossip. Located on pages 4 and 5.
- Sport – Located on the final two or three pages.
- Brainwave – The puzzles page, including a crossword, Sudoku and various (Mumma needed) other word games. Also included a horoscope under the heading of "Should I get out of bed tomorrow?"
- Talk – Essentially Letters to the Editor, although most letters were very short, having been sent via SMS. It was divided into several sections:
  - Vent Your Spleen – Devoted to readers' SMSed complaints (often about public transport services), comments and thoughts.
  - Overheard – Devoted to humorous or bizarre conversations overheard and sent in by readers.
  - Here's Looking At You – In which readers wrote messages to people on public transport to whom they are attracted, in the hope that they will reply and arrange a date, or just to anonymously compliment them. Originally such messages appeared in the general "Vent Your Spleen" section, but the practice became so popular that it was separated into its own section. "Here's looking at all of you" was the page-filling title page when the paper announced on 29 May 2015 its closure to the readers.
  - Lost in Love – Readers' responses to a request from another reader for relationship advice, and an invitation to send replies to the next day's question.
  - My Platform – A vox pop in which three people on the street gave a short response to a question. This section has been dropped.
- Flicks – That night's movie listings. A movie review used to feature in the middle of every flicks page but that was dropped in 2011 due to the space being needed for session time listings.
- The Box – Reviews of television programs screening that night.
- Program – That night's primetime (6:00pm – midnight) television listing. Was combined with "The Box".
- Citybeat – A weekly entertainment section with an emphasis on all genres of popular music, including CD and movie reviews, concert listings, band interviews and trivia. Appeared on Thursdays.
- Goss & Glam – Magazine-style entertainment and fashion news. Located on the middle four pages.
- Quickie – A short interview with a famous person. Dropped.
- CareerOne – Mainly job advertisements. Dropped.
- Flirt – A weekly section focused on love and relationships. Appeared on Fridays. Dropped.
- Weird – A two-page spread of weird news from around the world.
- Wanderlust – A two-page spread about travel destinations sponsored by Jetstar.

=== Staples ===
Some mX editions had been stapled, as they tended to remain contained and not blow around as much. This decision was also based on the capabilities of publishing equipment and whether binding systems were installed at the production facilities.

=== Theming ===
Occasionally the mX masthead was modified to capitalise on major events, such as a tennis ball and racquet during the Australian Open, and love hearts and using rose scented ink during Valentine's Day. On the day of the Wedding of Prince William and Catherine Middleton, the x was changed to a Union Jack and many pages said "The royal wedding" other pages said "Not the wedding". In the lead-up to both the 2007 federal election and 2010 federal election, the front page of each issue bore a "disclaimer" warning of the number of election stories (if any) contained within.

- Saint Patrick's Day editions had the blue captions replaced with green, and Irish themed stories fill the "Did You Know" and "What The?" sections.
- Easter editions did not change colour; however, the "Did You Know" and "What The?" sections related to modern Easter stories (such as the world's largest easter egg).

== Closure ==
On 28 May 2015, News Corp announced that the newspaper was closing down. The final edition was printed on 12 June 2015, and the corresponding mobile app was also closed down.

== Revival ==
In 2018 mX was briefly revived in Melbourne as part of a promotion by Carlton & United Breweries. Published on four consecutive Wednesdays from 26 September, it was only available at Flinders Street, Flagstaff, Melbourne Central, Richmond and Southern Cross stations. The same stunt was pulled again in 2024, this time to promote the Rising arts festival. Two issues were distributed to 60,000 city workers at key train stations in the Melbourne central business district.

== See also ==
- Junk food news
