= Kyabram Union =

Former newspaper in Victoria, Australia

The Kyabram Union was a weekly newspaper in Victoria, Australia from 1886 until 1894. The first issue was published 21 May 1886. In 1894, the name changed to the Kyabram Union & Rodney Shire Advocate. The paper ceased publication in January 1895 when it was absorbed by the Tatura Guardian.

The Kyabram Union was published every Friday. It initially contained four pages, but increased in size over the next nine years. As the Kyabram Union & Rodney Shire Advocate, the paper contained eight pages.

The Kyabram Union contained classified ads for local businesses, legal notices such as publican’s licences, auctions and local news. The 28 January 1887 issue states the objective of the paper: “we intend to make the paper as purely local as possible, and to obtain this we will spare no pains to have all the news of the Goulburn Valley supplied to us at first hand, at the same time foreign news of an important character shall be fully attended to.”

When the Kyabram Union commenced in May 1886, it was published by Benjamin Harrison Gummow and Henry Montague Sommer, who also owned the Tatura Herald. In January 1887, the newspaper was purchased by Edwin Thomas Davis and Co., who continued to publish it until February 1891 when it was published by Edward Hanley. Then in 1894, it was published by George Henry Orford and later Daniel Jenkins.
