= Logan Witness =

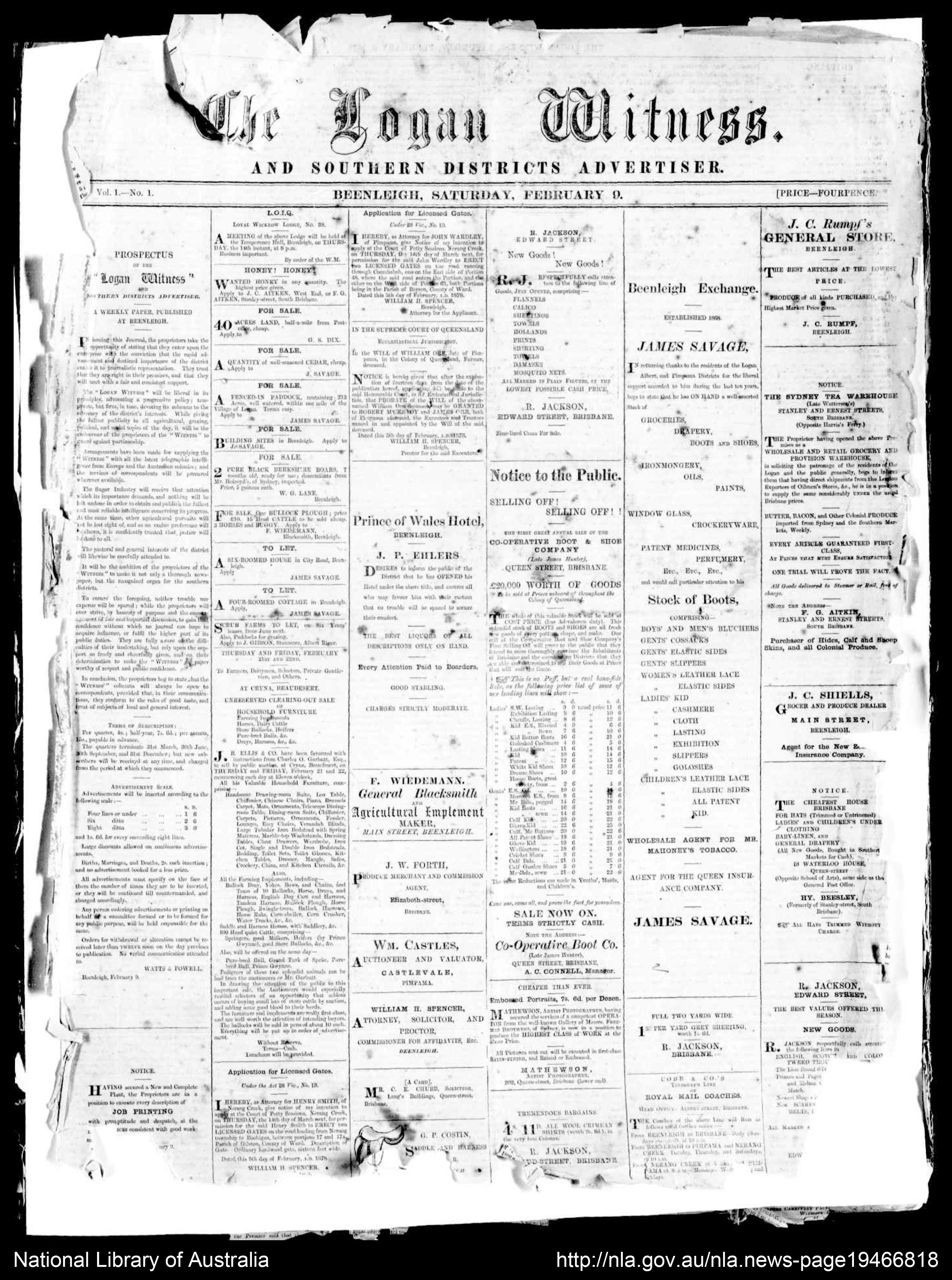
Page image from the National Library of Australia's Newspaper Digitisation Program,

The Logan Witness was a weekly English-language newspaper published in Beenleigh, Queensland, Australia from 9 February 1878 to 10 June 1893. The paper was four pages, double demy (57 cm x 90 cm) in size and issued on a Saturday.

== History ==
Established by proprietors William Watts and Edward Powell in 1878, The Logan Witness was the first newspaper to emanate from the Beenleigh district and was originally published as The Logan Witness and Southern Districts Advertiser. Initially optimistic that the rapid advancement of the district entitled it to journalistic representation, the paper struggled financially and was sold to Mr John Hinchcliffe by April 1879. During his proprietorship Hinchcliffe changed the newspaper name to The Logan Witness, advocated for the advancement of the district and spoke out against anything opposed to those interests. On Saturday 10 June 1893 the publisher declared that issue of The Logan Witness would cease temporarily, due to the unprecedented financial depression existing in the Logan district and all the colonies. The newspaper did not resume publication and Hinchcliffe soon after retired.

== Digitisation ==
The paper has been partially digitised as part of the Australian Newspapers Digitisation Program of the National Library of Australia.

== See also ==
- List of newspapers in Australia
- List of newspapers in Queensland
