= Murgon Advertiser =

Former newspaper of Queensland, Australia

The Murgon Advertiser was a newspaper published in Murgon, Queensland, Australia.

== History ==
In November 1947, Brian Keighley Gerardy (also known as Brian Keighley-Gerardy) purchased the printing plant of the Northern Boomerang in Mossman to relocate to Murgon to establish the Murgon Advertiser.

The newspaper was published from 1947 to 1949.

== See also ==
- List of newspapers in Australia
