= Port Fairy Gazette =

Former newspaper in Victoria, Australia

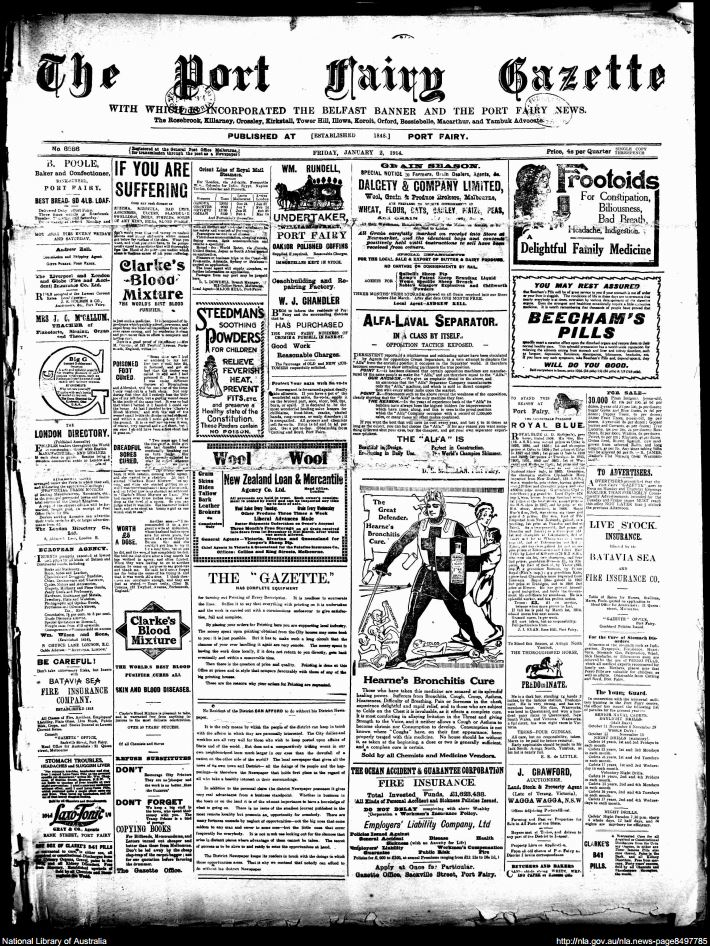
Front page of Port Fairy Gazette, 2 January 1914

The Port Fairy Gazette was an English language newspaper published in Port Fairy, Victoria, Australia.

== History ==
The Port Fairy Gazette was owned by Henry James Richmond from the mid-1890s, and by Edward Hanley from 1908 to 1934. His sons Vincent and Frank took over publication in the 1930s, and their brother Hugh later became editor.

During its publication history, the title of the newspaper alternated between the Port Fairy Gazette and the Gazette. It also absorbed a number of smaller newspapers including the Port Fairy Times & Macarthur news and the Port Fairy News.

The Gazette ceased publication in 1989.

== Digitisation ==
The paper has been digitised as part of the Australian Newspapers Digitisation Program of the National Library of Australia.

== See also ==
- List of newspapers in Australia
