= The Humpybong Weekly and Advertiser =

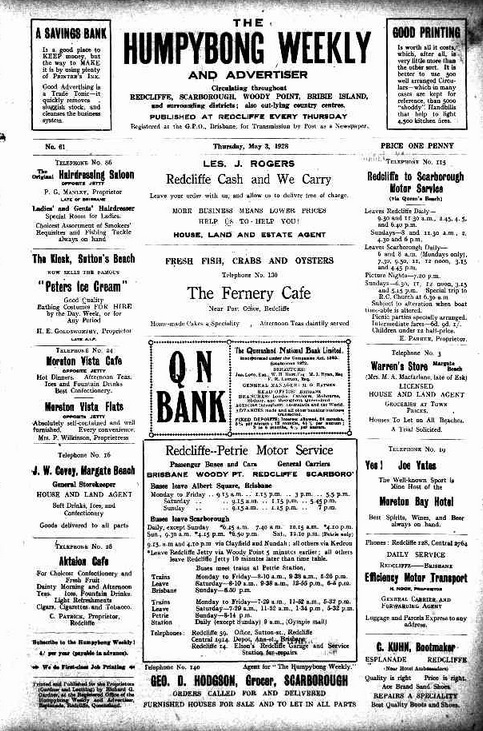
Front page of The Humpybong Weekly and Advertiser, May 3, 1928.

Humpybong Weekly and Advertiser was a weekly English language newspaper published on a Thursday in Redcliffe, Queensland, Australia.

== History ==
The Humpybong Weekly and Advertiser was a weekly English language newspaper printed and published by Richard Greenough Gardner in Redcliffe, Queensland and was first issued Thursday, 10 March 1927. It was the first newspaper printed on the Redcliffe Peninsula. From issue number 28 (Thursday 15 September 1927) the proprietors were recorded as Gardner and Leeming. The publisher claimed a circulation in Redcliffe, Scarborough, Woody Point, Bribie Island and surrounding districts. Reports of the Redcliffe City Council meetings give an insight into the issues of the time e.g. the construction of housing for families in need at Redcliffe during the Depression and employment of their breadwinners by Council. The publication ceased on Thursday, 10 November 1932 due to lack of advertising support.

== Digitisation ==
The paper has been digitised as part of the Australian Newspapers Digitisation Program of the National Library of Australia with support from the State Library of Queensland and the Moreton Bay Regional Council.

== See also ==
- List of newspapers in Australia
