= Adelaide Morning Chronicle =

Australian newspaper

- Type: Daily newspaper, then later a bi-weekly publication
- Founder(s): Andrew Murray
- Founded: 1852
- Political alignment: Conservative Anglicanism
- Ceased publication: 1853
- City: Adelaide
- Country: South Australia

The Adelaide Morning Chronicle was a newspaper published in Adelaide, South Australia during 1852 and 1853.

== History ==
While claiming not to be a religious newspaper, the Adelaide Morning Chronicle was established by the draper Andrew Murray during the South Australian Parliament's debate over separation of church and state. Its intention was to provide a voice for the influential and conservative Anglican section of the Adelaide community. This was in opposition to the opinions expressed by the non-conformist churches in their newspaper, the Austral Examiner.

The newspaper was of a sufficient quality to also be seen as competition to the South Australian Register. Murray later worked for the Melbourne Argus. The newspaper was reduced to a bi-weekly publication (rather than daily) after 35 issues in early 1852, through the economic effects of the Victorian gold rush and ceased in early 1853.
