= Kiama Examiner =

1858–1862 newspaper in Australia

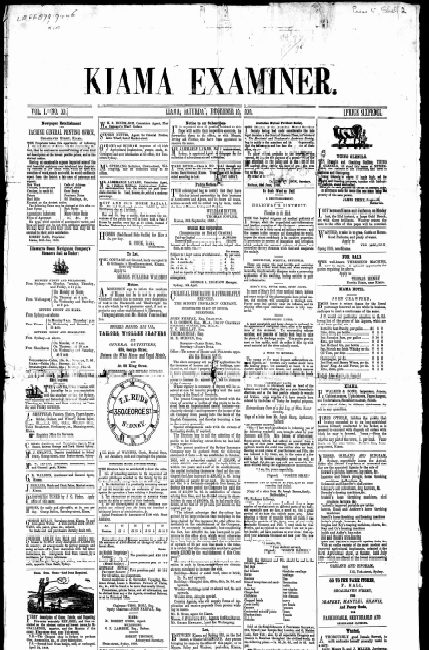
Front page of the Kiama Examiner, Saturday 18 December 1858

The Kiama Examiner, later published as The Examiner, was a weekly English language newspaper published in Kiama, New South Wales, Australia between 1858 and 1862. It was first published on 24 April 1858, more than forty years before the federation of Australia.

== History ==
The newspaper was first published in 1858 by Robert Barr. Robert Barr, a printer, sold the newspaper by public auction on 20 August 1859 to W. Vance, after damages of £200 were awarded against him for libel. Later the same year William Irving acquired the newspaper and from January 1860 the newspaper was published twice per week, on Wednesday and Saturday.

The last issue of the paper as The Kiama Examiner appeared on 10 December 1859, and the first issue of the paper under its new title The Examiner, appeared a week later on 17 December 1859. The last issue of the paper appeared in June 1863. The paper was then absorbed by the Illawarra Mercury.

== Digitisation ==
The paper has been digitised as part of the Australian Newspapers Digitisation Program hosted by the National Library of Australia in cooperation with the State Library of New South Wales.

== See also ==
- List of newspapers in Australia
- List of newspapers in New South Wales
