= Newsday (Melbourne) =

Former newspaper in Melbourne, Victoria

Newsday was an afternoon daily newspaper published by David Syme from 30 September 1969, designed to compete with the Melbourne Herald, then selling around 500,000 a day. Its first editor was Tim Hewat, but when it ran into circulation trouble Graham Perkin was drafted to try to save it. He spent several months editing both The Age and Newsday. Despite extensive marketing, the paper was closed in May 1970, putting 67 journalists out of work, including Cameron Forbes, Lindy Hobbs, Jack Darmody, Phil Cornford, Bruce Wilson, Piers Akerman, Michael Leunig and Mike Sheahan. The Sunday Observer, launched by the same company a few weeks after Newsday closed, was vastly more successful.

It had originally been intended as a Sunday newspaper. When this plan was scuttled - contributing factors may have been the print union refusal to work Saturdays and newsagents not being open on Sunday to provide sale outlets - it was launched as a weekday newspaper instead.
