= Traralgon Record =

Former newspaper in Victoria, Australia

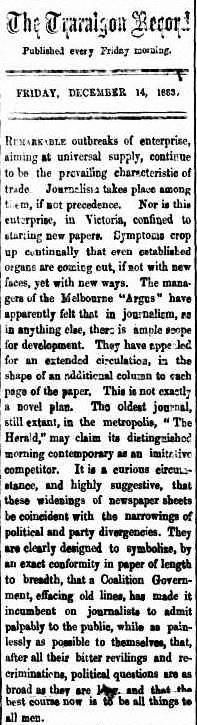
Traralgon Record, 14 December 1883, page 2

The Traralgon Record was a weekly newspaper published in Traralgon, Victoria from 1883 to 1932.

== History ==
The Traralgon Record was published from 14 December 1883 until 22 December 1932, when it was incorporated into the Traralgon Journal. It was also known as the Traralgon record and Morwell, Mirboo, Toongabbie, Heyfield, Tyers & Callignee advertiser.

John Baird was the proprietor of the Traralgon Record until December 1885, when it was purchased by Neale & Co. Neale & Co then sold to Ford Bros in February 1886, who then sold to Mr J. Burland & Mr A.C. Stevens in September 1888. In 1890, the partnership between Mr J. Burland and Mr A.C. Stevens was dissolved and Mr A. C. Stevens became partners with Mr John Guest, whose family continued to own the paper until it ceased on 22 December 1932. The final issue of the Traralgon Record stated, “For 42 years the newspaper has been in the hands of the Guest family, and the sole reason of its ceasing publication is the retirement from business life of the Editor and Proprietor (Mr J.Guest).”

The Traralgon Record was then absorbed by the Journal (Traralgon) in December 1932 under the ownership of Mr E. Barbor.

== Digitisation ==
The paper has been digitised from 1883 to 1932 as part of the Australian Newspapers Digitisation Program of the National Library of Australia.

== See also ==
- List of newspapers in Australia
