= John Medway Day =

(1838–1905) journalist and minister of religion

John Medway Day (24 February 1838 – 8 July 1905), generally known as J. Medway Day, was an English-born Australian journalist, Baptist minister and activist.

He was born at Bedford to carver Samuel Day and Elizabeth Stamford. He worked for a local solicitor before studying for the Baptist ministry in the early 1860s. He migrated to South Australia in 1866, becoming the minister at Mount Gambier until 1869, when he moved to Kapunda. In 1870–71 he was the chair of the South Australian Baptist Association, but in 1875 he left the ministry to become a journalist for the Register. He was acting editor for the paper in 1883–84, attracting some controversy for his views on land nationalisation. He married Ellen Sandland on 12 August 1886; they had no children.

From 1892 Day edited the Pioneer, the paper of the Single Tax League; then in 1893 edited his own short-lived weekly, The Voice. A strong reformist, he delivered many lectures on topics including land reform, women's suffrage, trade unionism and electoral politics. He ran unsuccessfully for the South Australian House of Assembly seat of Gumeracha in 1893, and later in the year a loose coalition had coalesced around him, the "Forward Movement", which included members from a wide variety of progressive causes.

In January 1894 Day moved to Sydney to edit the Australian Worker, and thus was involved in the formation of the Australian Workers' Union. He ran for Labor Party preselection for the 1895 colonial election; losing endorsement for Grenfell to William Holman, he instead contested Gundagai but was defeated (Holman also lost). He was widowed in 1894, and on 8 September 1897 married Marcella Mary Carr, also widowed. In 1904 he moved to Hobart to edit the Tasmanian Mail, but he died the following year having suffered an intestinal obstruction.
