= Queensland Country Life (1900–1910) =

Australian newspaper (1900–1910)

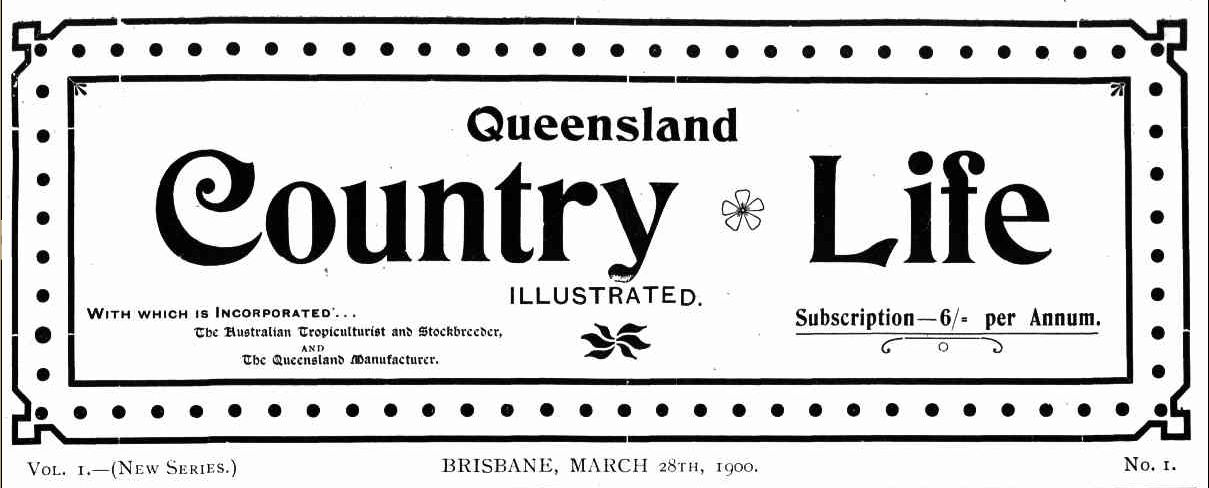
Queensland Country Life, masthead of first issue, Wed 28 March 1900

Queensland Country Life was a monthly newspaper published in Brisbane, Queensland, Australia.

== History ==
The first issue was published on 28 March 1900, replacing an earlier newspaper, the Australian Tropiculturalist and Stockbreeder. The newspaper was primarily focussed on agriculture but sought to cover a wide range of topics likely to be of interest to rural readers.

The last issue was published on 1 December 1910.

== Digitisation ==
The paper has been digitised as part of the Australian Newspapers Digitisation Program of the National Library of Australia.
