= Low (surname) =

Low is an English and Scottish surname, descendants of Clan MacLaren, is also a common surname found among Overseas Chinese communities around the world. Notable people with the surname include:

- Abiel Abbot Low (1811–1893), American entrepreneur and philanthropist
- Sir Alan Low (1916–1999), New Zealand economist
- Albert Peter Low (1861–1942), Canadian geologist and athlete
- Alice Low (suffragist) (1877–1954), British suffragist
- Alice Low (1926 – 2012), American author, lyricist, and editor.
- A. (Archibald) M. Low (1888–1956), British scientist and inventor
- Bartlett Marshall Low (1839–1893), American businessman and politician
- Beth Low, American politician
- Charles Low, 2nd Baron Aldington (born 1948), British banker
- Clorinda Low Lucas (née Elizabeth Jessemine Kauikeolani Low; 1895–1986) American Hawaiian social worker
- Dave Low (died 1916), Australian rules footballer
- David Low (agriculturalist) (1786–1859), Scottish agriculturalist
- David Low (cartoonist) (1891–1963), New Zealand political cartoonist
- Drury Low (born 1990), New Zealand Rugby League player
- Edward Low (1690–1724), English pirate
- Evan Low (born 1983), American politician
- Francis E. Low (1921–2007), American theoretical physicist
- Frank J. Low (1933–2009), American physicist
- G. David Low (1956–2008), American astronaut
- George Low (1926–1984), American NASA administrator
- George Low (Medal of Honor) (1847–1912), U.S. Navy sailor
- Harriet Low (1809–1877), American diarist
- Henry R. Low (1826–1888), New York politician
- Herbert Low (1867–1910), English-born journalist in Australia
- Hugh Low (1824–1905), British colonial administrator and naturalist
- Ivy Low Litvinov (1889–1977), English-Russian writer and translator, and wife of Soviet foreign minister Maxim Litvinov
- James F. Low (1925–2017), United States Air Force officer
- Juliette Gordon Low (1860–1927), founder of the Girl Scouts of the USA
- Mary Stanley Low (1912–2007), British-Cuban political activist, Trotskyist, surrealist poet, artist and teacher
- Norman Low (1914–1994), Scottish footballer and football manager
- Penelope Margaret Low (born 1933), birth name of British writer Penelope Lively
- Rochelle Low (born 1969), Canadian field hockey player
- Sam Low (born 1970), American businessman and member of the Washington State House of Representatives
- Seth Low (1850–1916), American educator and politician
- Stewart Low, Scottish footballer
- Low Thia Khiang (born 1956), Singaporean politician and businessman
- Toby Low, 1st Baron Aldington (1914–2000), British politician and businessman
- Tommy Low (1874–1938), Scottish footballer
- Trisha Low, American author and poet
- Vanessa Low (born 1990), German athlete
- Vincent Warren Low (1867–1942), British surgeon
- Willie Low (1889–1970), Scottish footballer
- Low Tuck Kwong, Indonesian billionaire businessman

== Fictional characters ==
- Axl Low, a character in the Guilty Gear video game series
- Low-Fa, character in the 1992 video game Laura Bow 2

== See also ==
- Atkin & Low family tree, showing the relationship between some of the above
- Löw, listing people surnamed Löw
- Liu (surname), Chinese surname
- Luo (surname), Chinese surname
