= A. Maurice Low =

British-American journalist and author

Sir Alfred Maurice Low
- Born: 14 July 1860; London, United Kingdom
- Died: 17 June 1929 (aged 68); Washington, D.C.
- Resting place: Congressional Cemetery
- Education: Dartmouth College
- Spouse: Annie Walker Baden (m. 1884)
- Relatives: Sir Sidney Low (brother); Herbert Low (brother); Barbara Low (sister); Frances Helena Low (sister); Ivy Litvinov (niece); David Eder (brother-in-law)

Sir Alfred Maurice Low (14 July 1860 – 17 June 1929) was a British-American journalist and author.

== Biography ==
Low was born in London to Jewish parents Therese (née Schacherl; 1835–1887) and Maximillian Loewe (1830–1900), who emigrated to Britain from Hungary following the 1848 uprising. His siblings included journalists Sir Sidney Low and Herbert Low, Frances Helena, and Barbara Low. Low was educated at King's College School in that city, and afterward in Austria, and later obtained a Master's degree from Dartmouth College.

From 1888 he was correspondent at Washington, D.C., for the Boston Globe, and from 1896 for the London Daily Chronicle, being the first Washington correspondent to be appointed by an English paper. From 1896 he also edited the American department of the London National Review. He later became Chief American Correspondent of the London Morning Post.

Low was a foreign correspondent in Cuba during the Spanish–American War, and went on to devote a large portion of his life to the study of Anglo-American relations. He wrote "The United States and Its Dependencies" for the Annual Register (London, 1901); and was a contributor to other influential magazines in England and America, including Collier's Weekly, Harper's Weekly, The Forum, North American Review, Scribner's, McClure's, and The Fortnightly Review. He was the author of The Supreme Surrender, a novel (New York, 1901).

Low argued in favor of an imperial federation.

His efforts to promote the Allied cause in the United States during the World War I were rewarded by a knighthood as part of the 1922 Birthday Honours. He died of arteriosclerosis in Washington on 17 June 1929.

== Publications ==
- "Some Light on the Canadian Enigma". The Forum. 27. New York: The Forum Publishing Company: 479–490. 1899.
- The Supreme Surrender: A Story of Modern American Life. New York: Harper & Brothers. 1901.
- Protection in the United States: A Study of the Origin and Growth of the American Tariff System, and Its Economic and Social Influences. London: P. S. King & Son. 1904.
- America at Home. London: George Newnes, Limited. 1908.
- The American People: A Study in National Psychology. Vol. 1. Boston: Houghton Mifflin Company. 1909.
- The American People: A Study in National Psychology. Vol. 2. Boston: Houghton Mifflin Company. 1911.
- Great Britain and the War. Washington, D.C.: Columbian Printing Company. 1914.
- The Freedom of the Seas. Washington, D.C.: Columbian Printing Company. 1915.
- The Law of Blockade. London: Sir Joseph Causton & Sons. 1916.
- Woodrow Wilson: An Interpretation. Boston: Little, Brown, and Company. 1918.
