= Ivy Low Litvinov =

English-Russian writer, translator and wife of Maxim Litvinov (1889–1977)

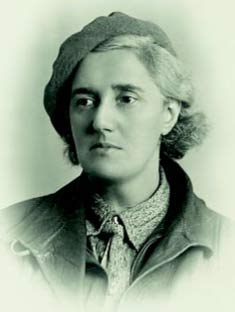
- Portrait of Low Litvinov, c. 1920
- Born: Ivy Teresa Low; 4 June 1889; London, United Kingdom of Great Britain and Ireland
- Died: 16 April 1977 (aged 87); Hove, East Sussex, United Kingdom
- Occupation: Writer
- Spouse: Maxim Litvinov (m. 1916; died 1951)
- Children: 2
- Relatives: Sidney Low (uncle); A. Maurice Low (uncle); Barbara Low (aunt)

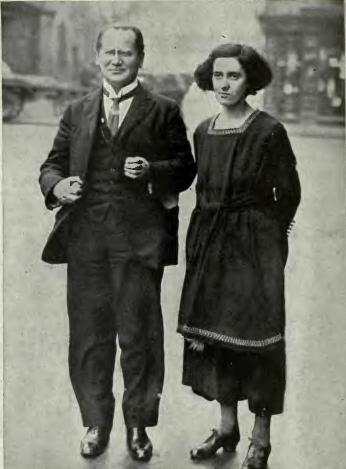
Maxim and Ivy Litvinov in 1918

Ivy Teresa Low Litvinov (Russian: Айви Вальтеровна Литвинова) (4 June 1889 – 16 April 1977) was an English-Russian writer and translator, and wife of Soviet diplomat and foreign minister Maxim Litvinov. She was also known as Ivy Low, Ivy Litvinova or Ivy Litvinoff.

== Biography ==
Ivy Low was born in London into an Anglo-Jewish family. Her father Walter was a friend of H. G. Wells. In 1894 her father died, and in 1896 her mother Alice remarried to John Alexander (Sandy) Herbert, and published some novels under the name Alice Herbert. Early in 1916 Ivy Low married Maxim Litvinov, who at the time was a revolutionary exile living in London. They had two children, Mikhail (Misha) and Tatiana (Tanya).

Following the Russian Revolution Maxim returned home in 1918, and she followed him two years later. Maxim Litvinov became a prominent diplomat and served as People's Commissar for Foreign Affairs (foreign minister) from 1930 to 1939, and Soviet ambassador to the United States from 1941 to 1943. He died in 1951, having survived the purges of nearly all of his closest colleagues despite having fallen out of favour with Stalin on more than one occasion.

Apart from brief stays abroad as part of her husband's diplomatic service, she lived in the Soviet Union for most of her adult life before moving permanently to Hove, England in 1972, where she died in 1977. Looking back on the precarious situation that Maxim and Ivy had faced in the Stalin era, George Kennan wrote "It is one of the wonders of the age that Ivy survived to die a natural death."

== Family ==
Low's grandfather Maximilian Loewe emigrated from Hungary to England after the unsuccessful revolution of 1848. Through her father Walter, she was the niece of author Sir Sidney Low. Another uncle, Sir Maurice Low, was a journalist and Washington correspondent for British newspapers. One of her aunts was Barbara Low, psychoanalyst, and another aunt, Edith, married David Eder. Through her son Misha, she was grandmother of Pavel Litvinov. Through her daughter Tatiana, she was grandmother of the journalist Masha Slonim (aka Maria Phillimore-Slonim), who married Robert Godfrey Phillimore, 3rd Baron Phillimore.

== Writing career ==
Low wrote the novels Growing Pains in 1913 and The Questing Beast in 1914, as well as His Master’s Voice: a Detective Story in 1930. She also wrote about a dozen short stories published in The New Yorker magazine beginning in the 1960s. A collection of short stories was published in book form as She Knew She Was Right.

In 1946 she wrote the article "A visit to D.H. Lawrence" in Harper's Bazaar, about a six-week visit she had made in 1914 to the author and his soon-to-be wife Frieda in Tuscany.

She produced numerous translations of Russian literature into English, including Maxim Gorky's Literary Portraits, and also wrote or edited reference books for Russian-speaking learners of English. In the 1930s she supported the teaching of Basic English.

== Sources ==
- Carswell, John (1983). The Exile: A Life of Ivy Litvinov. London: Faber & Faber. ISBN 0571131352.
