= C. J. Dennis =

Australian poet (1876–1938)

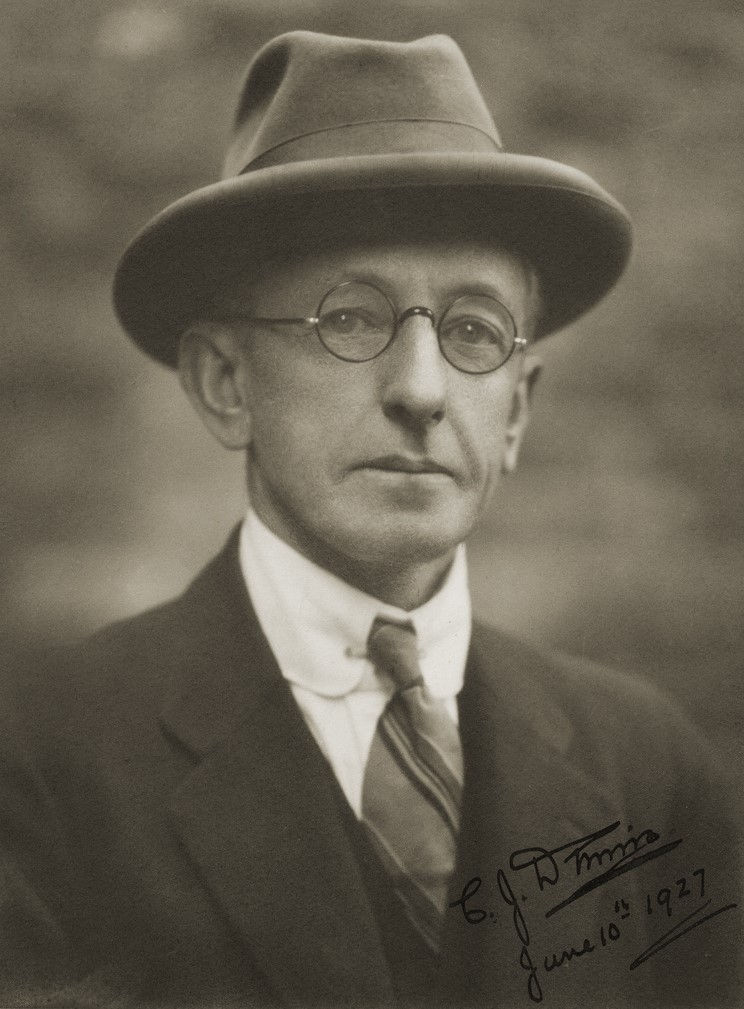
- Born: Clarence Michael James Dennis; 7 September 1876; Auburn, South Australia
- Died: 22 June 1938 (aged 61); Melbourne, Victoria, Australia
- Burial place: Box Hill Cemetery; 37°49′21″S 145°8′8″E
- Occupation: Writer
- Notable work: The Songs of a Sentimental Bloke
- Parent(s): James Dennis; Kate Francis Dennis (nee Tobin)

Clarence Michael James Stanislaus Dennis (7 September 1876 – 22 June 1938), better known as C. J. Dennis, was an Australian poet and journalist known for his best-selling verse novel The Songs of a Sentimental Bloke (1915). Alongside his contemporaries and occasional collaborators Henry Lawson and Banjo Paterson, Dennis helped popularise Australian slang in literature, earning him the title "the laureate of the larrikin". He was Australia's most popular and prolific poet, selling more than 700,000 books and publishing more than 4,000 poems.

When Dennis died, Australia's then Prime Minister, Joseph Lyons, said he was destined to be remembered as the "Australian Robert Burns".

== Biography ==
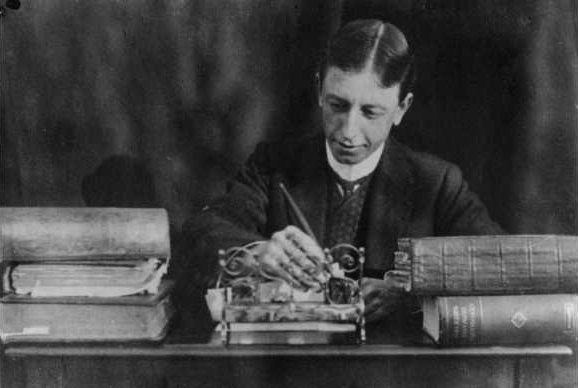
Dennis, ca. 1890s

Dennis was born in Auburn, South Australia, the first of three sons to Irish-born parents James Dennis (born 1828) and his second wife Katherine "Kate" Frances (née Tobin) (1851–1890), both had emigrated to Australia in the 1860s, his father leased hotels in, successively, Auburn, Watervale, Gladstone and Laura. His mother suffered ill health, so Clarrie (as he was known) was raised initially by his great-aunts, then went away to school, Christian Brothers College, Adelaide, as a teenager.

Dennis left school at 17 and worked as a junior clerk for an Adelaide stock and station and wool-buying firm; by the age of 19 he was employed as a solicitor's clerk. It was while he was working in this job that, like banker's clerk Banjo Paterson before him, his first poem was published under the pseudonym "The Best of the Six". He went on to publish in The Worker, under his own name, and as "Den", and in The Bulletin. His collected poetry was published by Angus & Robertson.

He joined the literary staff of The Critic in 1897, and after a spell doing odd jobs around Broken Hill, returned to The Critic, serving for a time c. 1904 as editor, to be succeeded by Conrad Eitel. In 1906 he co-founded and edited The Gadfly as a literary magazine; it ceased publication in 1909.

Dennis left The Gadfly and Adelaide for Melbourne in November 1907. In 1908, he camped with the artist Hal Waugh at Toolangi, north-east of Melbourne, near Healesville. Toolangi was his home for most of the rest of his life. Dennis married Margaret Herron in July 1917. She published two novels and a biography of Dennis called Down the Years.

His first poem to achieve national recognition was entered in the Bulletin contest for a national song in 1908. The Real Australian Austra-laise won a special prize akin to the people's choice. This poem was re-published several times in Dennis's later works and in 1915 it was reprinted by the government as a marching song for the First AIF. Dennis's reference to the generic great Australian adjective in this poem has ensured the relevance of the poem for all subsequent generations.

Between 1913 and 1924 he published nine books of poetry, telling the stories of working class Australians during and after the Great War. Most famously he wrote The Sentimental Bloke, a love story in fourteen poems, published in Oct 1915 which sold 60,000 copies in the first twelve months, and over 300,000 copies during his lifetime: leaving us with immortal characters, The Bloke, Doreen and Ginger Mick. The Sentimental Bloke and The Moods of Ginger Mick were re-published in 1916 as special editions, Pocketbooks for the Trenches, given to departing Diggers. Dennis's books outsold the "trenches" books by Will Ogilvie and A B Patterson by a 5 to 1 ratio.

During this period in 1917 he wrote the satirical Glugs of Gosh, a Lewis Carroll-like commentary on Australia's selling of natural resources, only to have to buy back the manufactured products. In 1921, Dennis wrote one of his most enduring works, A Book for Kids, which included children's poems such as “Hist”, “The Traveller”, “The Ant Explorer”, and “The Triantiwontigongolope”.

From 1922 until his death in 1938 he served as staff poet on the Melbourne Herald, contributing over 3000 poems observing Australian life and commenting on national events. He was acknowledged as an unofficial Australian Poet Laureate, observing and writing on events in Australian life. He wrote poems regularly during this period to commemorate Anzac Day and Remembrance (Armistice) Day and this work helped shape the Australian remembrance of the Great War amongst the returned diggers and the general public.

His poetry was also successful in lifting the spirits of Australians during the Great Depression. In 1935 he published his last book, The Singing Garden with poems describing the sounds, sights and emotions evoked by his bush home in Toolangi, north of Melbourne.

In the 1930s he also wrote some screenplays including His Royal Highness (1932) with George Wallace.

Dennis died in 1938 from cardio-respiratory failure and is buried in Box Hill Cemetery, Melbourne. The Box Hill Historical Society has attached a commemorative plaque to the gravestone. Dennis is also commemorated with a plaque on Circular Quay in Sydney which forms part of the NSW Ministry for the Arts – Writers Walk series, and by a bust outside the town hall of the town of Laura. At Auburn, the South Australian place of his birth, a drinking fountain and birdbath were unveiled in 1953 in his honour.

In 1976, ABC produced and broadcast The Life and Times of C. J. Dennis, timed to coincide with the 100th year of Dennis' birth. The docu-drama starred John Derum as Dennis and is set around the time when Dennis produced The Gadfly.

== Criticism ==
Dennis had his detractors: "The Insect" (perhaps Herbert Low) of The Newsletter: an Australian Paper for Australian People called him "a doleful person", calling his prose "dreary imitations of Mr. Dooley" and his topical verse "very poor". Lumping Dennis with Eitel, he opined that The Critic was "unfortunate" in its choice of editors.

== Bibliography ==
Books

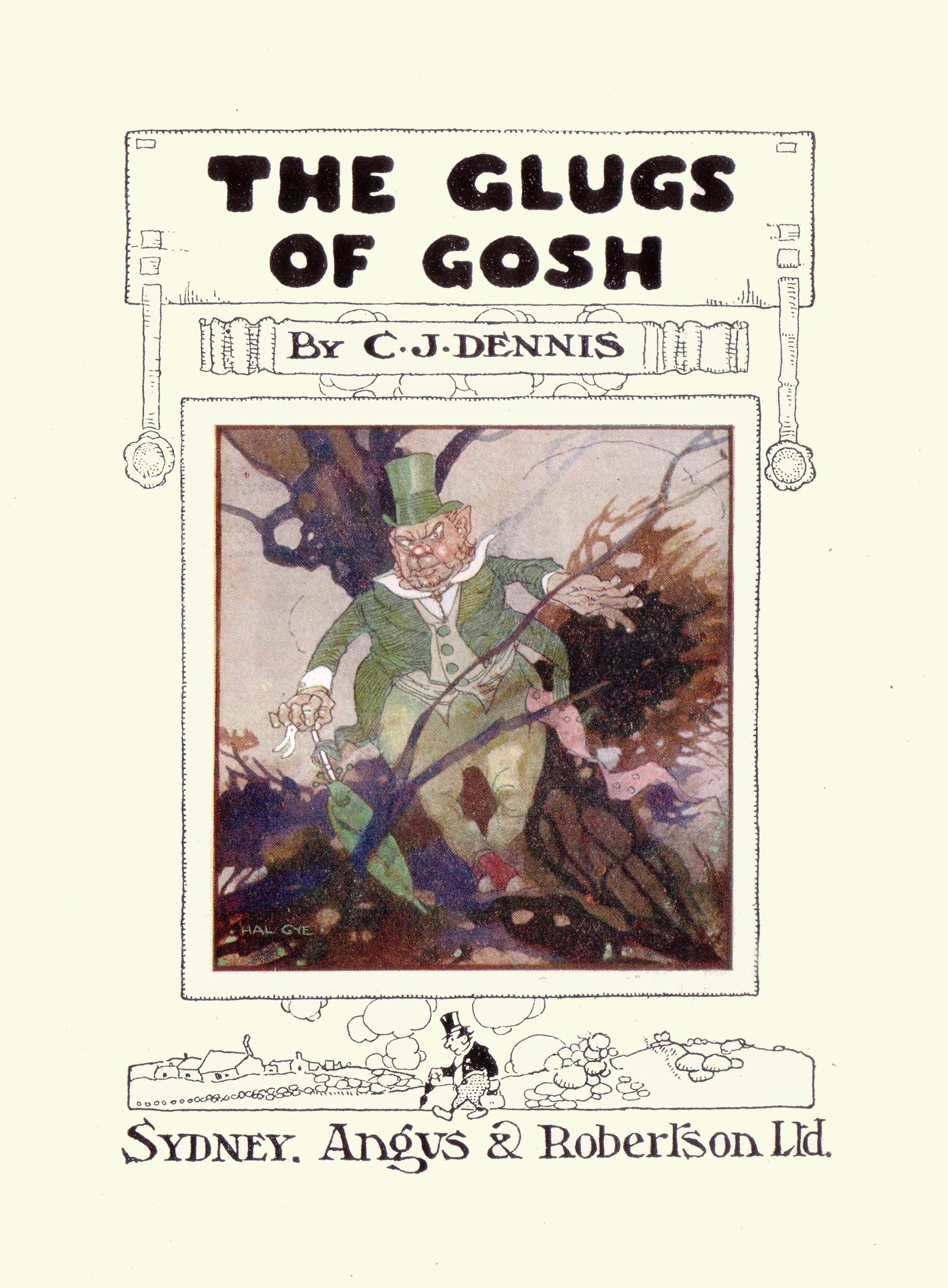
Cover of The Glugs of Gosh

- Backblock Ballads and Other Verses (1913)
- The Songs of a Sentimental Bloke (1915)
- The Moods of Ginger Mick (1916)
- The Glugs of Gosh (1917)
- Doreen (1917)
- Digger Smith (1918)
- Backblock Ballads and Later Verses (1918)
- Jim of the Hills (1919)
- A Book for Kids (1921) (reissued as Roundabout, 1935)
- Rose of Spadgers (1924)
- The Singing Garden (1935)
- The Ant Explorer (posthumously, 1988)

=== Selected list of poems ===
Title	Year	First published	Reprinted/collected in
"The Austra-laise"	1908	The Bulletin, 12 November 1908	Backblock Ballads and Other Verses, E. W. Cole, 1913, pp. 110–111
"An Old Master"	1910	The Bulletin, 4 August 1910	Backblock Ballads and Other Verses, E. W. Cole, 1913, pp. 19–22
"Wheat"	1913		Backblock Ballads and Other Verses, E. W. Cole, 1913, pp. 110–111

== See also ==
- Angus & Robertson
- C. J. Dennis Prize for Poetry
