= The Critic (Adelaide) =

Australian weekly magazine

The Critic was an Adelaide weekly magazine that ran from 1897 to 1924. It is remembered as the paper in which C. J. Dennis began his literary career, and was later its editor.

== History ==
The first issue was published 25 September 1897, of 18 pages price 6d. The first two pages consisted of advertisements and the rest summaries of the week's news, a gossip page, sports, theatre reviews, and a page devoted to mining investment and a full page editorial cartoon by Amb Dyson. The publishers' offices were in 71, Brookman's Building, Grenfell Street, Adelaide.

The last issue, subtitled "The Federal Weekly" was published 28 May 1924. Its head office was at 110 Franklin Street, Adelaide. It was of 26 pages and priced at 6d. On page 1 was an announcement that the next issue was to be on sale 5 June priced 4d. This turned out to be a new weekly "Gossip", and an attempt to recover the fortunes of a style of newspaper, described by a contemporary as a "society paper", which had been largely displaced by the larger dailies, which had their own gossip and society pages, sports, theatre and investment pages at a lower price.

Editors included C. J. Dennis c. 1904, succeeded in 1905 by Conrad Eitel.

== Digitization ==
Issues from Vol. I No.1 (may be viewed here) to Issue No. 1370 of 28 May 1924 (may be viewed here) are available on-line and accessible via Trove, a service of the Australian National Library.

== See also ==
- The Gadfly, magazine founded in Adelaide by C. J. Dennis that ran from February 1906 to February 1909
