= Barbara Low =

Barbara Low may refer to:

- Barbara Low (psychoanalyst)
- Barbara Low (biochemist)
