= Claude Marquet =

Australian political cartoonist (1869–1920)

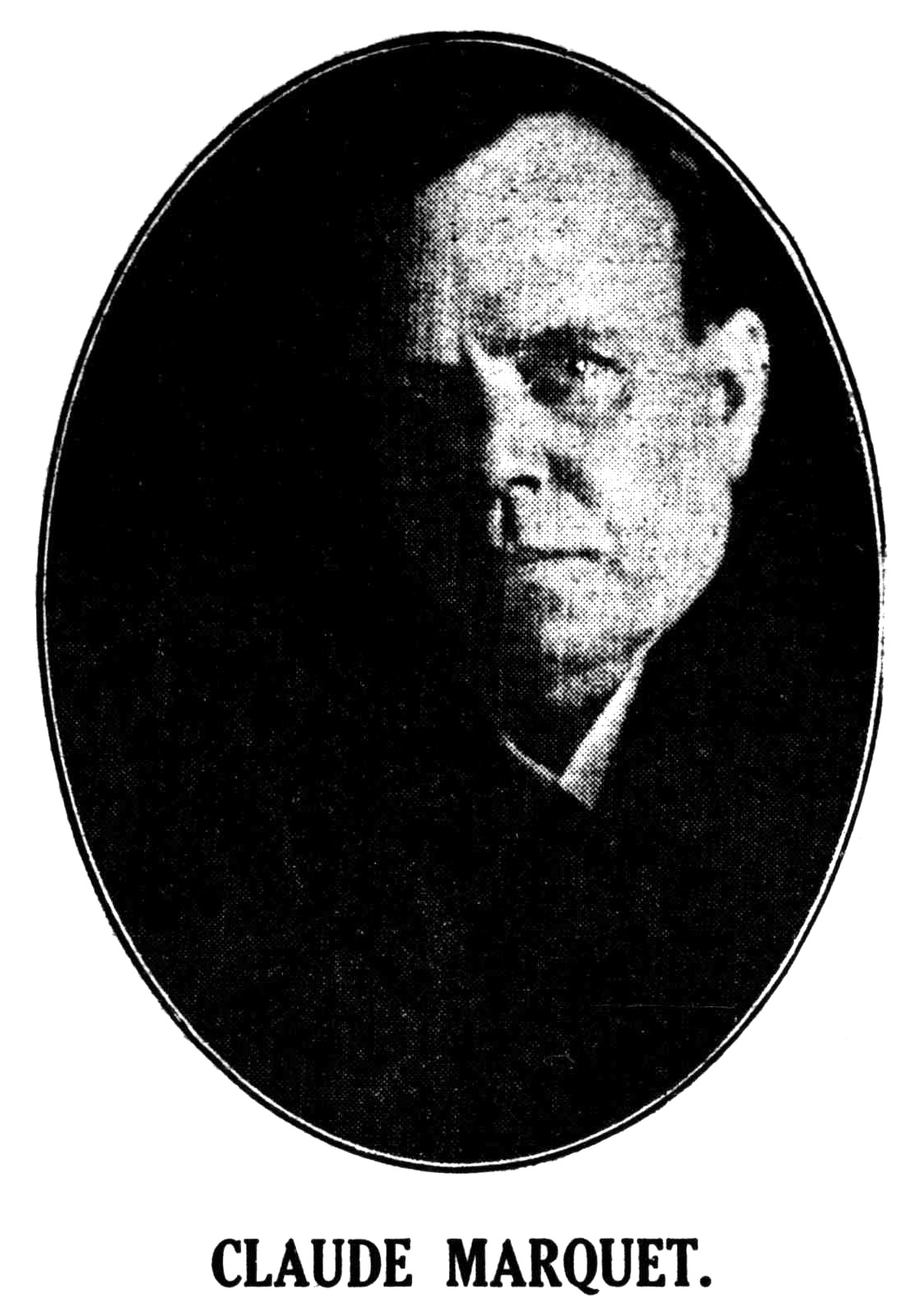
- Born: Claude Arthur Marquet; 8 May 1869; Moonta, South Australia, Australia
- Died: 17 April 1920 (aged 50); Botany Bay, Australia
- Occupations: Artist, cartoonist, illustrator

Signature
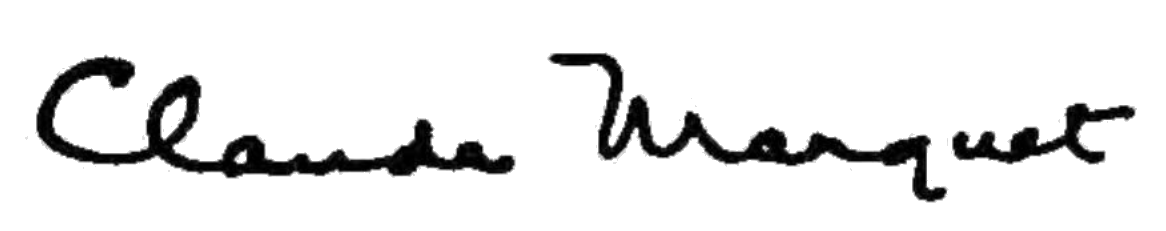

Claude Arthur Marquet (1869–1920) was an influential Australian political cartoonist, noted for his bold illustrative style and strong commitment to the labour movement and radical politics.

Marquet developed his artistic skills without formal training while working as a compositor for The Advertiser newspaper in Adelaide. In 1898 he was employed by Quiz magazine as a cartoonist. Marquet moved to Melbourne in 1902. His cartoons were published in the socialist newspaper The Tocsin, as well as publications such as Table Talk and the Sydney-based Bulletin. From March 1905 to October 1907 Marquet was employed by Melbourne's Punch magazine. In about December 1907 he moved to Sydney to join the staff of The Worker (later renamed The Australian Worker), a weekly newspaper aligned with the union movement in Australia. Marquet remained with The Australian Worker until his death in April 1920 in a boating accident.

Marquet was best known for his uncompromising political cartoons, particularly during the years he worked for The Worker newspaper, but his output also included social satire and comic strips intended for child readers. He was a prolific illustrator who worked almost exclusively in the black-and-white medium, his illustrations rendered in bold lines suited to newspaper reproduction. Marquet's dedication to unionism and democratic socialist values was reflected in much of his work (occasionally compromised in line with the more conservative views of his employers). His political cartoons came to particular prominence during the conscription debates of 1916 and 1917 when his work (notably 'The Blood Vote') was used for widely distributed leaflets by anti-conscription advocates.

== Biography ==
=== Early life ===
Claude Marquet was born on 8 May 1869 in the copper-mining community of Moonta on the Yorke Peninsula of South Australia, the only son of Charles Marquet and his wife Mary (née McArthur). His father, of French descent, was a painter by trade and a member of a local amateur theatrical group, the Moonta Amateur Histrionic Club. Claude's father died suddenly in November 1872, aged 30, "of bronchitis after an exceedingly brief illness", leaving a widow and three young children.

Young Claude was educated at Moonta and Wallaroo, the port town 11 miles (18 km) north of Moonta, in schools associated with the Anglican minister Rev. C. Goodenough Taplin.

=== Newspaper work ===
After leaving school Marquet began his working life in the local copper mines. The young man also worked as a diver and as a labourer on the wharves in his early working life. Later he gained an apprenticeship as a compositor on the Kadina and Wallaroo Times newspaper.

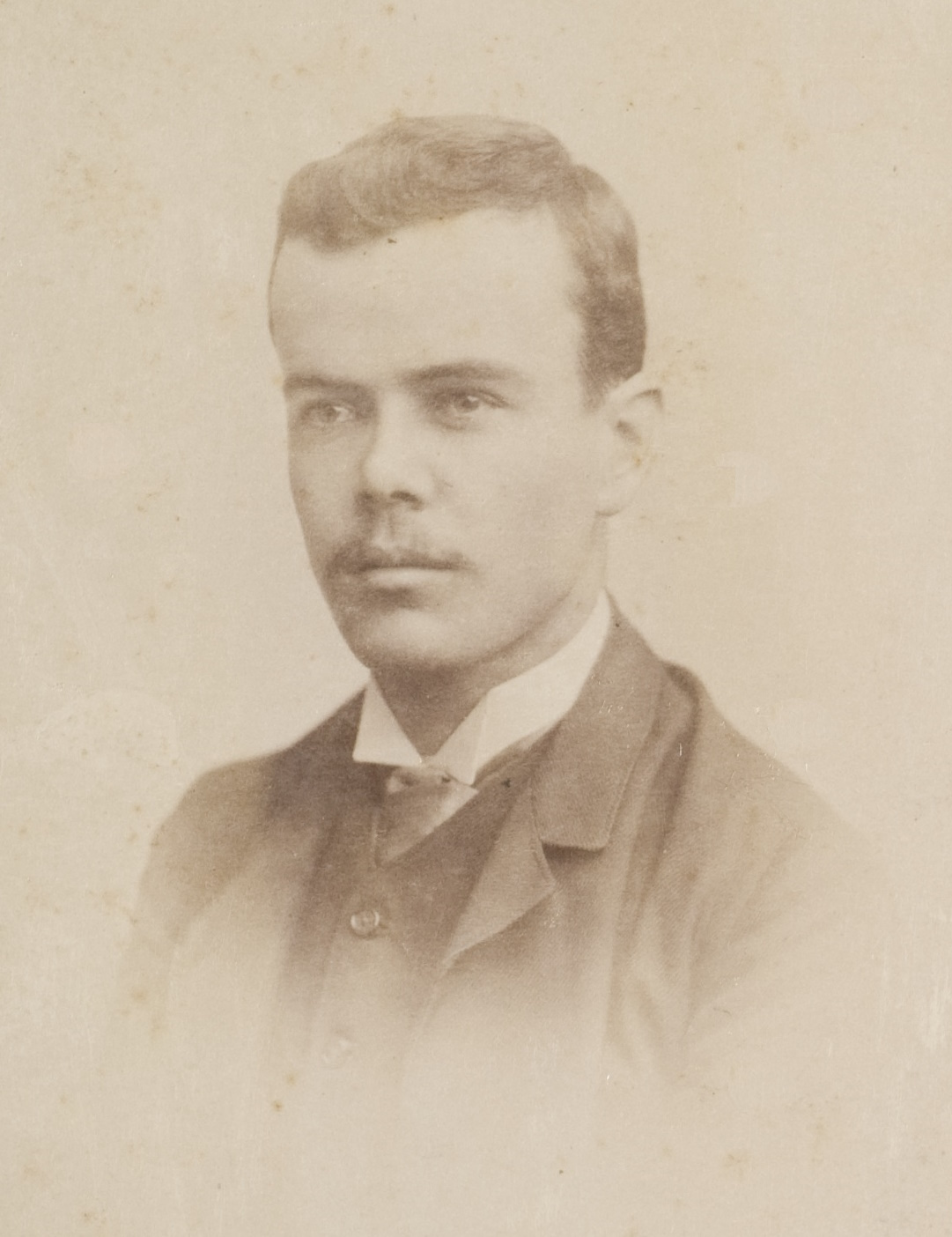
Claude Marquet, aged about sixteen.

In 1888 Marquet, aged nineteen, was living at Broken Hill, in the far west of New South Wales, where he was employed as a compositor for the Broken Hill Argus, the township's first morning newspaper. By the end of the year the Argus had been bought out by the Silver Age newspaper. An early indication of Marquet's developing artistic talent was "the famous skull and crossbones picture he produced for the comical 'wake' the Broken Hill 'Argus' staff held on the corpse of the defunct morning paper". Following the closure of the Argus Marquet and many of his fellow 'comps' (typesetters) went to Adelaide to find work. Marquet joined the staff of the Adelaide morning newspaper, The Advertiser.

It was said of Marquet that he was "born and bred amidst the tyranny and travail of capitalistically-controlled industrial conditions" where he "learnt to know what the wage-slaves were compelled to endure". Throughout his adult life Marquet considered himself to be a socialist, but he rejected revolutionary means to achieve that end in favour of the democratic process.

While working as a typesetter, Marquet acquired a sound knowledge of the processes of producing a newspaper.

Claude Marquet and Ann Donnell were married on 16 June 1891 in St. Mary's church at Wallaroo.

Marquet had "an artistic turn of mind" and developed his artistic skills without any formal training. An art-work by Marquet, titled 'Summer Afternoon', was included in the annual South Australian Society of Arts Exhibition in Adelaide, which opened in June 1896. A reviewer for Quiz magazine described the work as "middling".

After the death of William H. Jeffery in December 1896, who had been the managing printer of The Advertiser newspaper for the previous 22 years, funds were raised amongst his fellow employees to erect a headstone on his grave at the West Terrace Cemetery. The headstone, of Italian marble on a granite base and erected in September 1897, was designed by Marquet and incorporated elements of "the material used in the printers' craft".

In a review in Quiz magazine of the 1897 Society of Arts Exhibition in Adelaide, the writer commented that "Mr. Claude A. Marquet can hardly be said to have made much advance in his art".

=== Quiz magazine ===
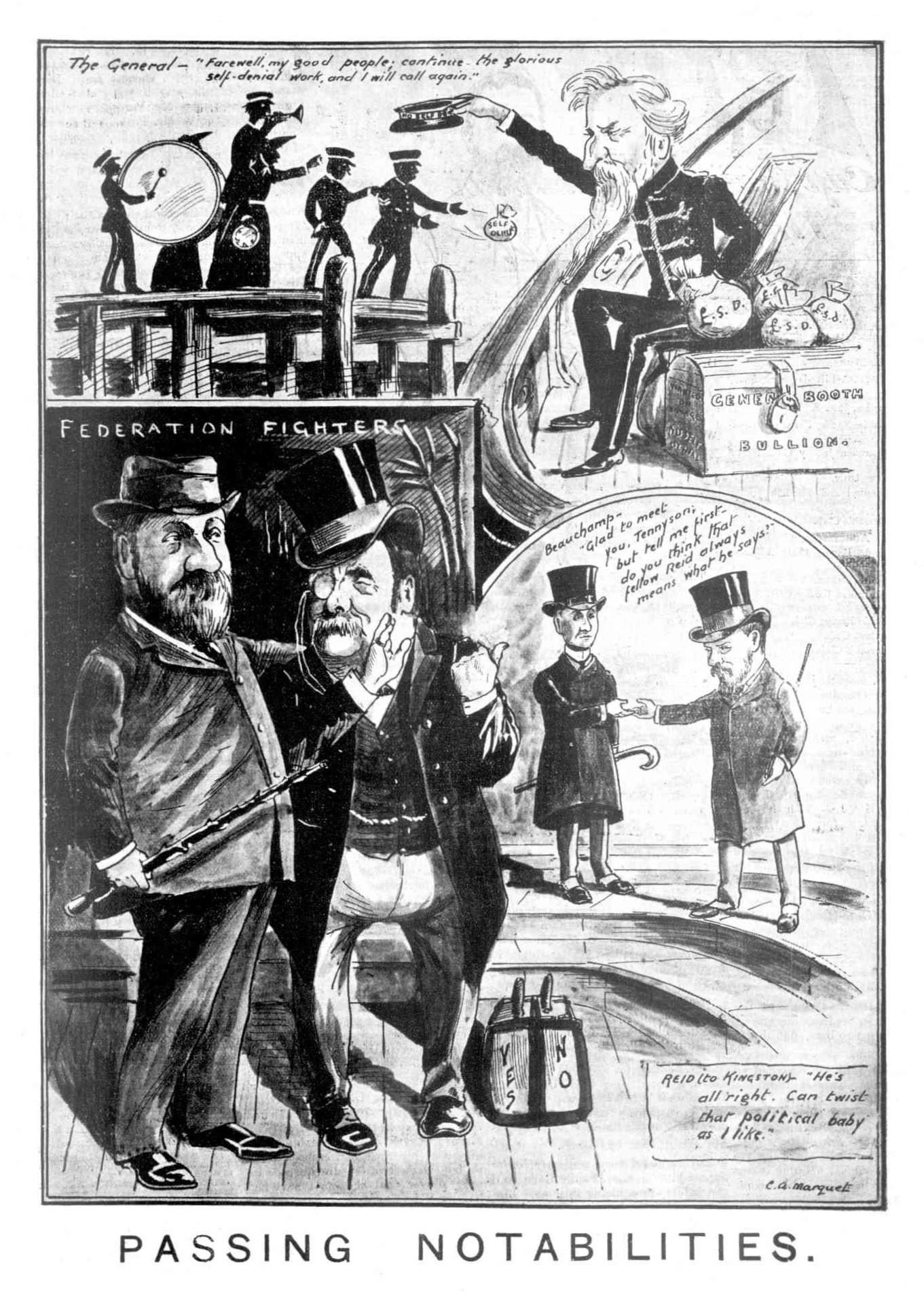
'Passing Notabilities', published in Quiz (Adelaide), 18 May 1899; featuring caricatures of William Booth, Charles Kingston, George Reid and the Governors of New South Wales and South Australia.

In early 1898 Marquet found his first regular employment as an artist for the weekly Adelaide magazine Quiz, replacing John H. Chinner who had left to join the newly established magazine The Critic. Chinner's final cartoons for Quiz were published in December 1897. Marquet's cartoons and caricatures began to be regularly published in Quiz from early February 1898. For many of his early cartoons Marquet worked directly onto wood or copper and prepared the surfaces for reproduction by carving or etching the material himself.

The Quiz issue of 7 June 1900 included a special supplement featuring a portrait of Lord Roberts which was reproduced by color photography from a watercolour painting by Marquet. The fine art print, engraved by Mather & Hanks and printed by Hussey & Gillingham, was described as being "the first of its kind ever executed in South Australia". Lord Roberts, as commander of the British forces in the Second Boer War, had been a celebrated figure in the news after a series of early victories in South Africa. Marquet's sympathetic portrait of Roberts could be compared to the artist's more cynical cartoon in the same issue of Quiz, 'John Bull Gathers in the Fruits of Victory'.

In addition to his work for Quiz, Marquet also contributed illustrations to Adelaide's Sporting Life. During 1900 Marquet also had cartoons accepted by The Bulletin magazine in Sydney.

Marquet and fellow cartoonist Ambrose Dyson (who was on the staff of the weekly Adelaide magazine The Critic) were members of the Corkscrew Club. In April 1901, at the Earl of Zetland Hotel, a "valedictory dinner and smoke social" was held by the club for Oscar Bailey, a club member leaving Adelaide to work in Melbourne. Marquet and Dyson designed and illustrated decorative menu cards for the occasion, "illustrating the Bohemian aspect of the 'convivium', treated in a highly artistic manner".

Marquet's final cartoons for Quiz were published in November 1901. Towards the end of 1902 he moved to Melbourne.

=== Melbourne ===
In May 1903 the Melbourne-based weekly socialist newspaper The Tocsin introduced illustrations to its format featuring the work of Claude Marquet. The issue of 21 May included a full-page political cartoon by Marquet on the first page of the newspaper, a feature that was continued in subsequent issues. In the 28 May issue (and subsequent issues) the newspaper's regular columns – 'Topical Echoes', 'Woman's Point of View', 'Concerning Somebody', 'Industrial Items', 'The Organiser at Work' and 'Political Labour Council' – were published with illustrated banners, each of them drawn by Marquet (signed with a distinctive 'c.a.m.'). A few of Marquet's feature cartoons published in The Tocsin in June 1903 were signed 'Quet', but from the 18 June issue his cartoons were signed with his full name.

Beginning on 4 June 1903, double-page political cartoons by Marquet were published in the Melbourne weekly magazine Table Talk. His double-page political cartoons in the body of the weekly journal became a regular feature for the next twelve months. A cartoon by Marquet was published in the 1903 Punch Annual, Melbourne Punch's annual special publication.

During October and November 1903 Marquet's regular page-one feature cartoon was absent from The Tocsin, though the issue of 26 November included a double-page cartoon as a supplement, 'Symeism Versus Democracy', notated with "Drawn on zinc and etched by C. A. Marquet". By mid-December 1903 Marquet's regular cartoons had resumed, appearing regularly until early May 1904 (but only occasionally after that).

Marquet's last cartoon for Table Talk was published on 4 June 1904. In June 1904 he was replaced as the "special cartoonist" for Table Talk by Charles Nuttall. In announcing the change it was claimed that "Mr. Marquet has left Victoria to fill an important position in a neighbouring State". Considering that Marquet had regular cartoons published in the Sydney-based journals The Bulletin and The Worker during the latter half of 1904, it is possible that he relocated to Sydney for a short period.

From July to December 1904 Marquet's cartoons were published in The Bulletin magazine. Marquet also contributed cartoons to The Critic in Adelaide. His work was included in the special "Xmas number" of the magazine, published on 14 December 1904. On 22 October 1904 a cartoon by Marquet was published on page one of The Worker, the Sydney-based weekly newspaper produced by the Australian Workers' Union. Beginning from the 5 November 1904 issue his cartoons regularly appeared on page five of the newspaper. Marquet's cartoons were a regular feature in The Worker until early March 1905, after which they appeared only occasionally.

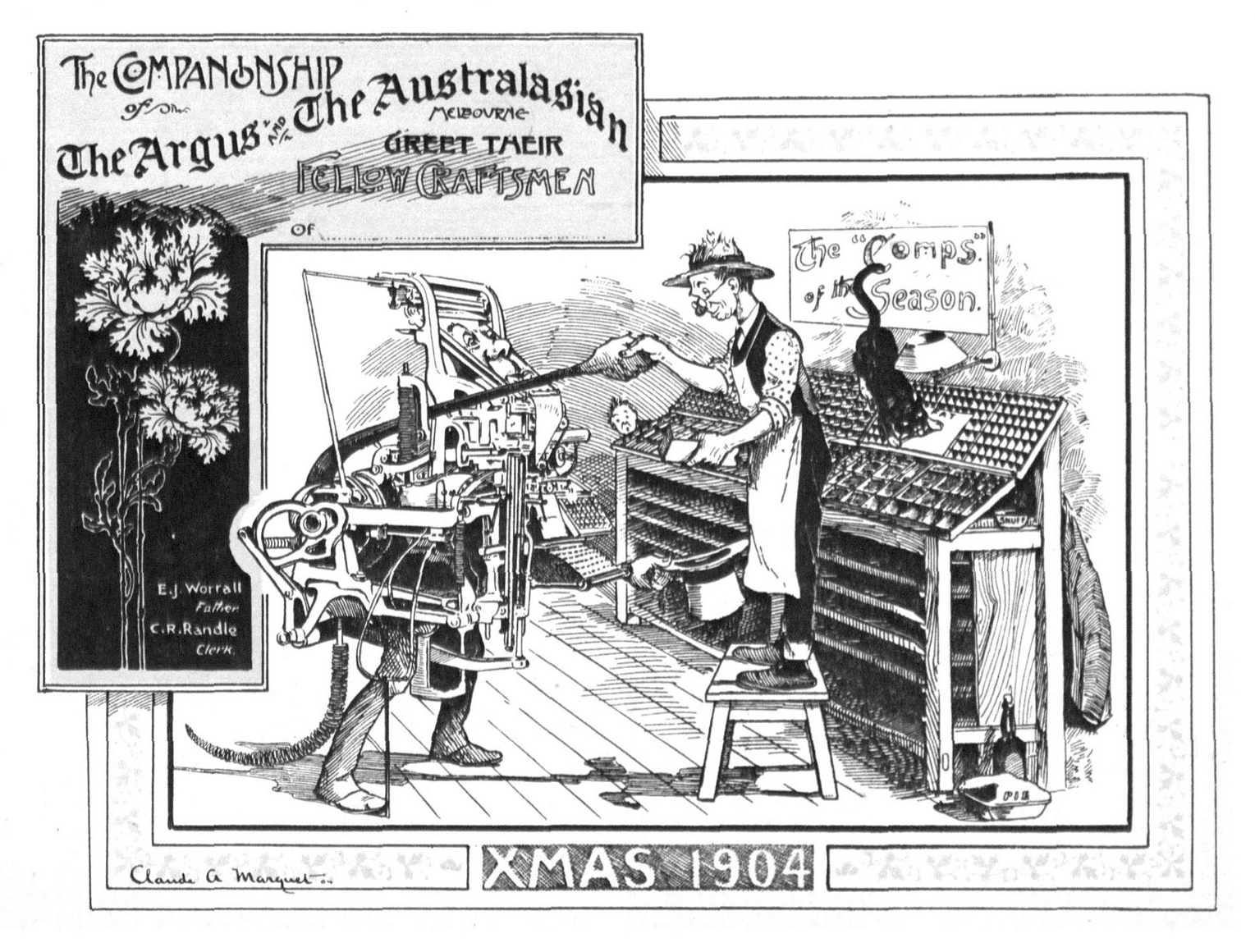
The compositors' Christmas card illustrated by Marquet (December 1904).

In late 1904 Marquet drew and printed a satirical Christmas card on behalf of the compositors employed by The Argus and The Australasian newspapers. The image on the card showed an anthropomorphised Linotype machine shaking hands with a compositor, at a time when mechanical type-setting was replacing the jobs of large numbers of 'comps' in Melbourne.

A cartoon by Marquet was published in the 3 November 1904 issue of Melbourne's Punch. The Punch Annual for 1904, published on 6 December, included at least eight of Marquet's cartoons, several of them being large format illustrations including a full-page illustration of 'An A.N.A. Conference' (incorporating the 1905 calendar) and a full-page twelve-frame comic strip 'Across the Continent'. A short story written and illustrated by Marquet, 'How Smith Left Home', was published in Punch in the issue of 29 December 1904.

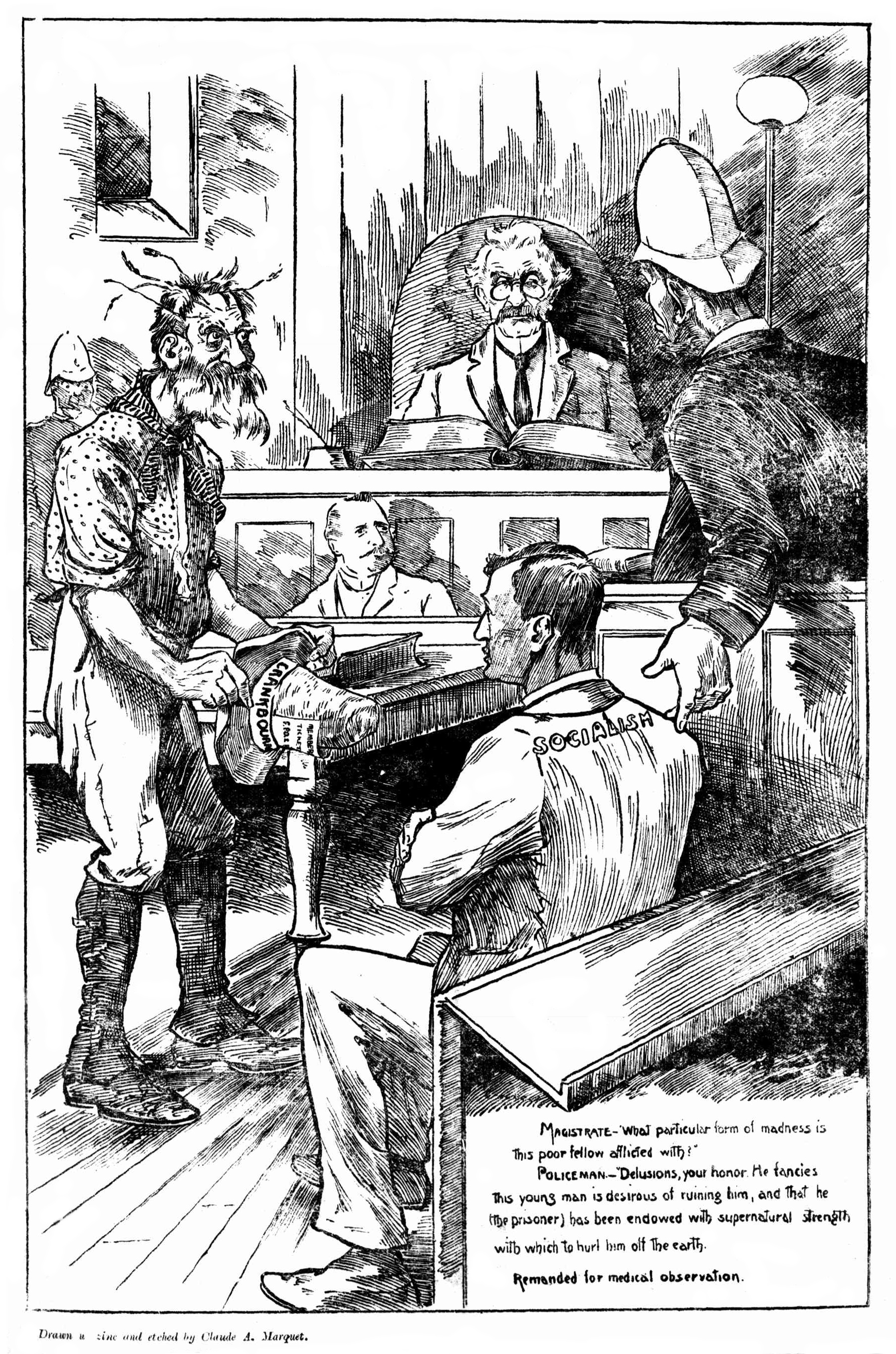
'The Deluded Crankbournian', published in The Tocsin (a Melbourne socialist newspaper), 8 January 1904.

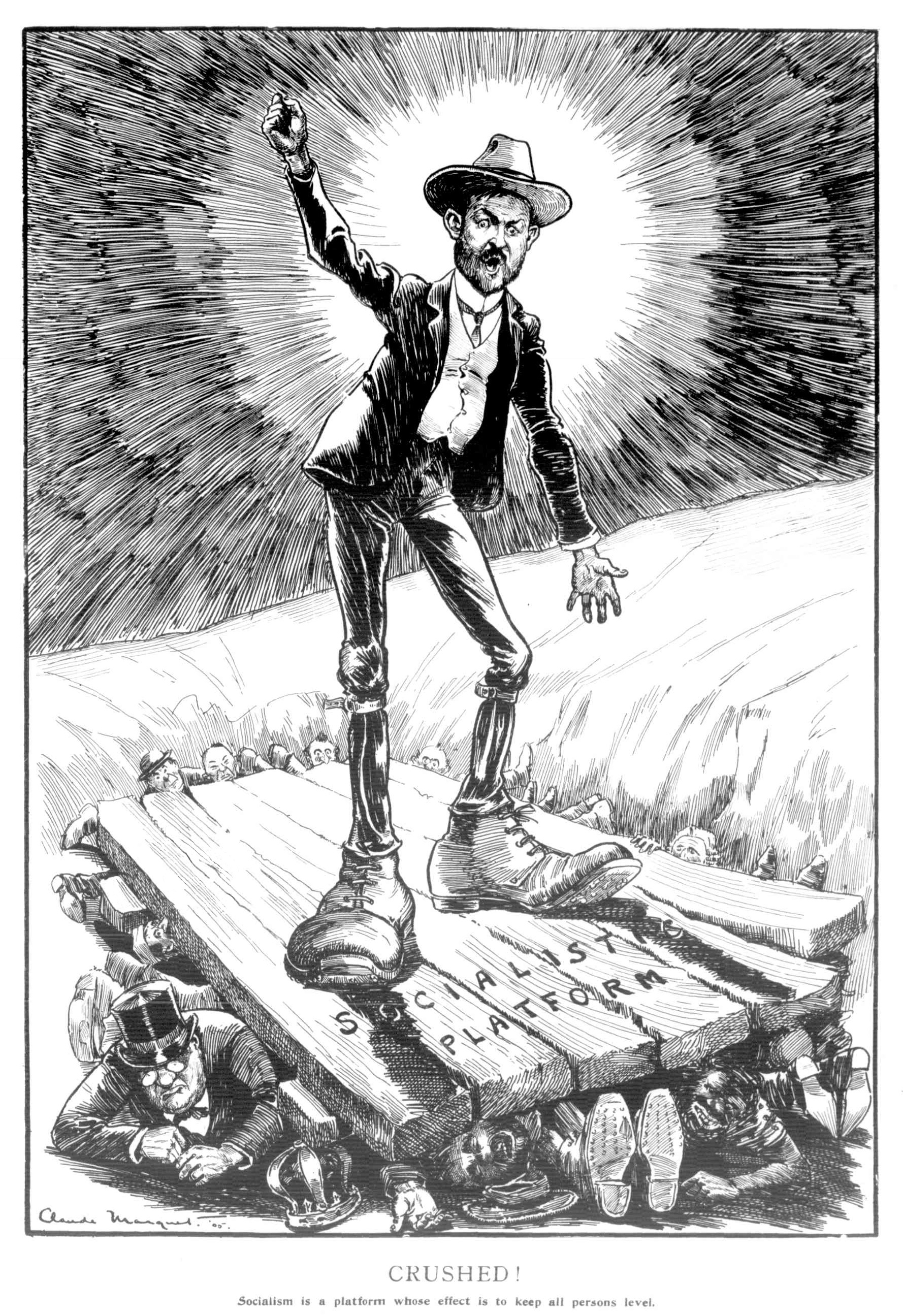
'Crushed!', published in The Supremacy of Socialism (a publication of the conservative Melbourne Punch newspaper), 30 October 1906.

Opposing views of socialism by Marquet.

During January and February 1905 Marquet had an occasional cartoon published in Punch, but from March 1905 his work was regularly featured in the journal. He was employed as an artist for Punch until October 1907, working alongside another artist, Alek Sass, who became a life-long friend. Melbourne's Punch had a conservative editorial stance, later described by Sass as "ultra-Tory".

Marquet's cartoons for the Melbourne Punch were a mix of political or social satire, as well as comic strips intended for child readers. The conservatism of Punch probably led to a considerable amount of constraint and self-censorship by Marquet in regard to his more political cartoons. His work for Punch often amounted to moderate jibes at politicians when compared to his later more incisive and uncompromising cartoons for The Worker newspaper. Alek Sass later commented that Punch "could not make of [Marquet] a mere repeating machine of its editorials".

In late-May and June 1906 Marquet had three political cartoons published in Adelaide's The Critic magazine. One of his cartoons was also published in The Worker in October 1906.

On 30 October 1906 Melbourne Punch published a 50-page special issue titled The Supremacy of Socialism, a volume of anti-socialist articles and cartoons purporting to be a depiction of a future Australia "when Socialism has become the law of the land, and the Southern Cross shines wonderingly upon a country where all men are equal, and no one class has any advantage over the other". The publication had the stated intention influencing voters for the Federal election to be held on 12 December 1906 in favour of George Reid's Anti-Socialist Party. The Supremacy of Socialism included a series of polemical cartoons by the Punch stable of artists, George Dancey, Alek Sass and Claude Marquet, as well as the London artist Dudley Hardy. Marquet's later work for The Worker in Sydney was consistently critical of the Anti-Socialist Party.

Marquet's contributions to the Punch Annual for 1906 included six cartoons, as well as two six-frame coloured comic strips about a kangaroo named 'Liza' Roo.

During March and early April 1907 Australian newspapers published extensive reports describing the dramatic rescue of a miner, Modesto 'Charlie' Varischetti, at Bonnievale in the Coolgardie goldfields district of Western Australia. Varischetti was trapped in an air pocket after a rainstorm flooded the underground mine where he was working. After five days of pumping and the clearing of debris, divers were able to reach the trapped miner via the flooded mine-shafts, taking with them supplies of food and candles. The divers continued to visit Varischetti until, after ten days, water levels had dropped sufficiently for the miner to be bought to the surface. A painting by Marquet titled 'The Rescue of Varischetti' was published in the 4 April 1907 issue of Punch, depicting when one of the divers emerged from the water to reach "the entombed miner". Marquet's painting included a diagram of the mine-shafts "showing how Varischetti was reached". A reference to the painting in The Worker praised the work for its authenticity, referring to the artist's practical experiences as both a diver and a miner when he was a young man.

Marquet continued to produce cartoons for Punch until the issue of 24 October 1907. Seven of his cartoons were included in the Punch Annual, published in December 1907, by which time Marquet had moved to Sydney to join the staff of The Worker, a newspaper closely aligned with the labour movement (and espousing political views more complementary to his own).

=== Sydney ===
In about December 1907 Marquet relocated to Sydney to take up the position as staff cartoonist for The Worker, the weekly newspaper produced by the Australian Workers' Union. By that stage the newspaper's office was in Bathurst Street in Sydney. Marquet's full-page political cartoons on the cover page of The Worker commenced in the issue of 2 January 1908.^{[A]}

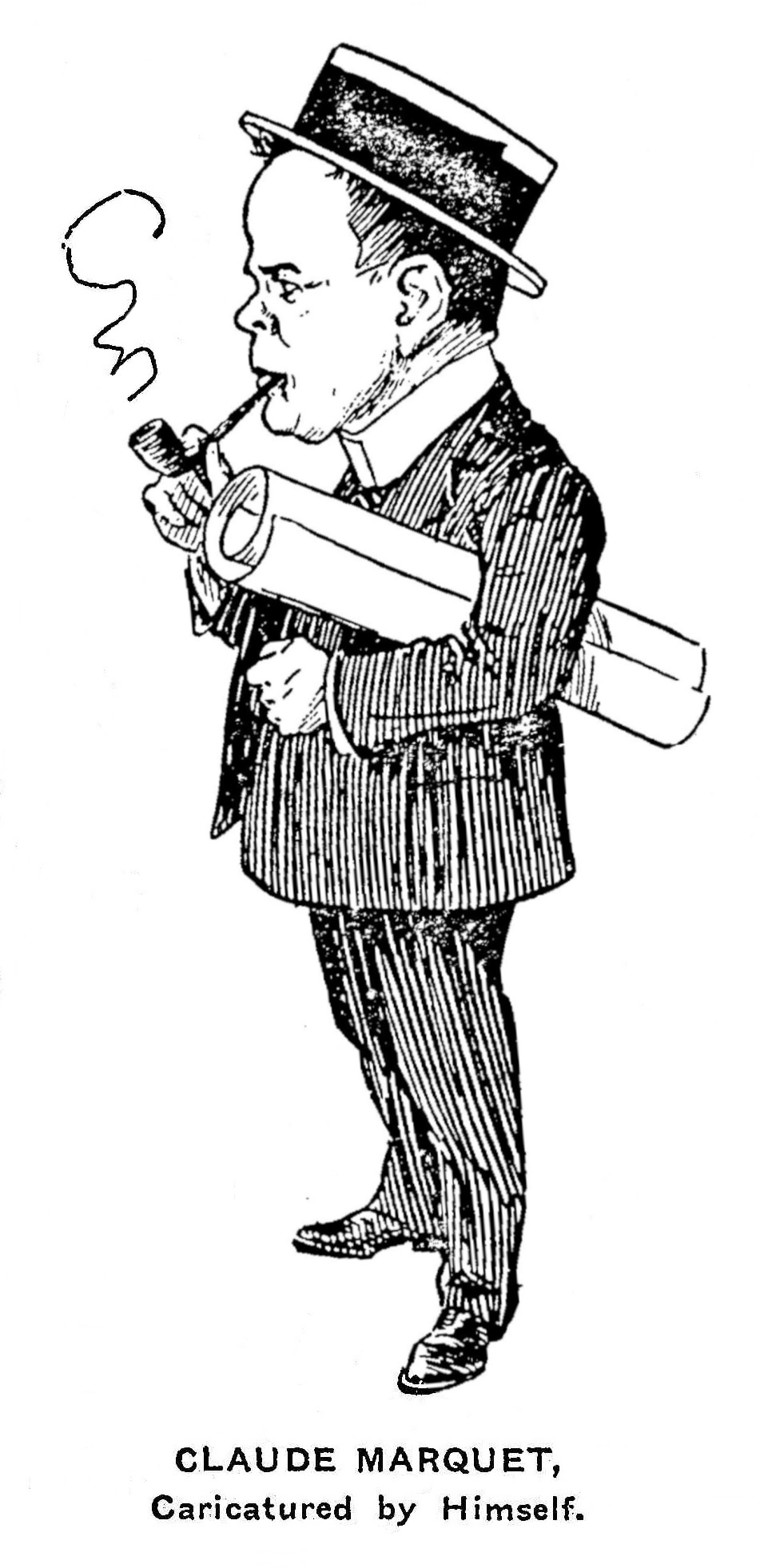
Marquet "caricatured by himself" in 1909.

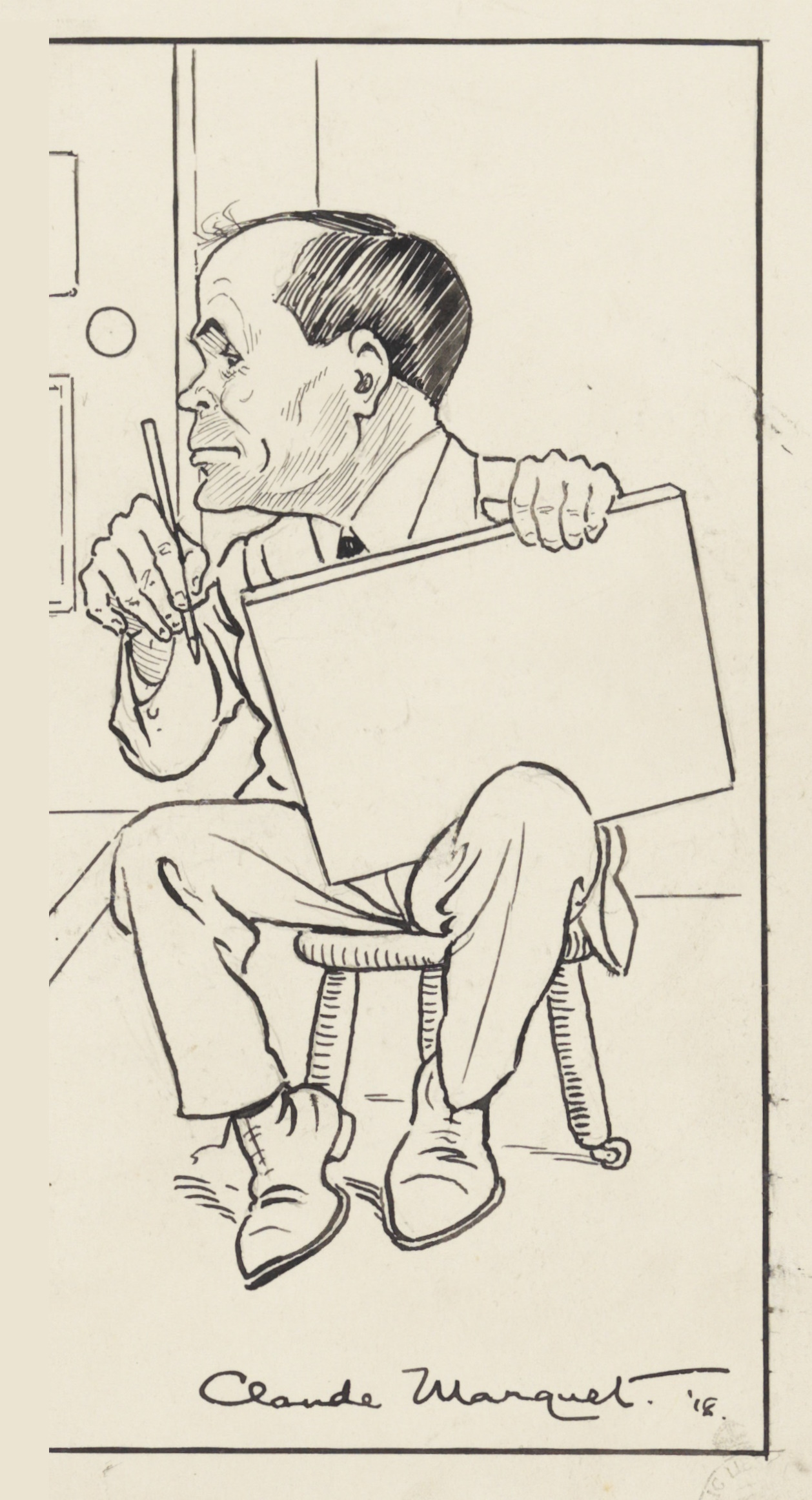
Another self-caricature (detail), May 1918.

Marquet remained on the staff of The Worker (renamed The Australian Worker in November 1913) until his premature death in 1920. During this period he "drew a prodigious number of cartoons", sometimes at least four a week. His central thematic elements had been established in Melbourne and were carried through to his work in Sydney: "workers as muscular, heroic, generally urban and always male; their enemies as fat-men, monopolists, and monsters; the bound and suffering worker as noble sacrifice; and the armed and sometimes bloody worker as victor". Marquet's cartoons and illustrations were drawn with pen and ink "in the traditional three-dimensional style". He used bold outlines in a style well suited to the newspaper reproduction methods of the day.

Marquet was a contributing artist to Vumps, "a profusely-illustrated sixteen-page penny 'comic'", published in Sydney in August 1908. He illustrated the cover of the comic book, as well as contributing a number of cartoons throughout the publication. Marquet's contributions included a full-page eight-frame comic strip featuring two homeless vagrants named 'Marmyduke Miffles' and 'Snoofter McSnickle' (reminiscent of the English 'Weary Willie' and 'Tired Tim' characters from the Illustrated Chips comic magazine). Vumps (subtitled "Pure Australian Fun") was Australia's first comic book, promoted as a rival to the English 'boys own' comics. However, the Australian publication did not survive beyond its first issue.

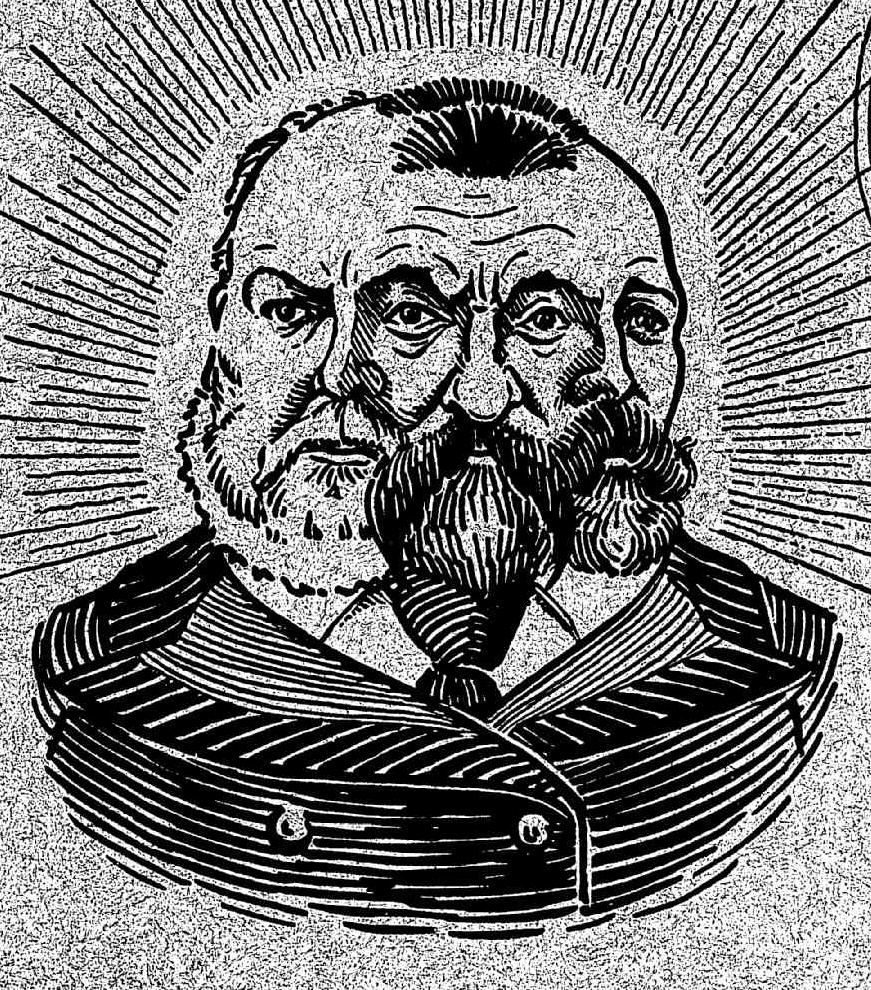
A composite caricature of John Forrest, Alfred Deakin and Joseph Cook, an illustration from Fusion Fancies (1909).

Marquet was one of the artists contributing to Our Annual, the holiday season special publication by The Worker published in December 1908 and selling for threepence. He also contributed to Our Annual in 1909.

Marquet contributed comic strips intended for child readers to the Melbourne Punch Annual for the years 1908 to 1910, published in early December for each year. His contributions in December 1908 were several six-frame comic strips, 'The Demon Motor' and 'The Tantanoola Tiger-Hunt'. His comic strip contributions to the 1909 Punch Annual were 'The Tormented Trapper' and 'Strange Things Found in the Sea'. The 1910 Punch Annual featured two more of his comic strips, 'Blierotter's Terraquaeroplane' and 'The Story of the Deadly Cigarette'.

In November 1909 The Worker newspaper published a book called Fusion Fancies: A Selection of Political Cartoons. The book was a collection of Marquet's cartoons from the pages of The Worker, "artistically printed in several colours", on the subject of the 'fusion' of the Protectionist Party and the Anti-Socialist Party to form the Liberal Party, which held office federally from June 1909 to April 1910 under prime minister Alfred Deakin and his deputy Joseph Cook (both of whom had previously been leaders of the merged parties).

Marquet drew fifteen full-page illustrations for Steele Rudd's The Dashwoods, published in March 1911. He also illustrated That Droll Lady written by Thomas E. Spencer, also published in 1911. Marquet also contributed to the short-lived Lilley's Magazine, the first number of which was published in June 1911. He illustrated a short story titled 'The Crippled Mare', written by Lyn Ridge and published in the December 1913 issue of The Lone Hand.

In about 1914 Marquet built a "fine cottage facing the beach at Kurnell", south of Sydney on the southern headland of Botany Bay. The artist constructed the residence "with his own hands and skill". Claude and Ann Marquet kept fowls and ducks and had an extensive garden. The couple were known for their hospitality, with visitors welcomed "without any regard to color, caste or creed". Marquet owned a small sailing boat which he used for fishing, recreational pursuits and acquiring provisions from the suburb of Botany on the northern shore of Botany Bay.

=== The war years ===
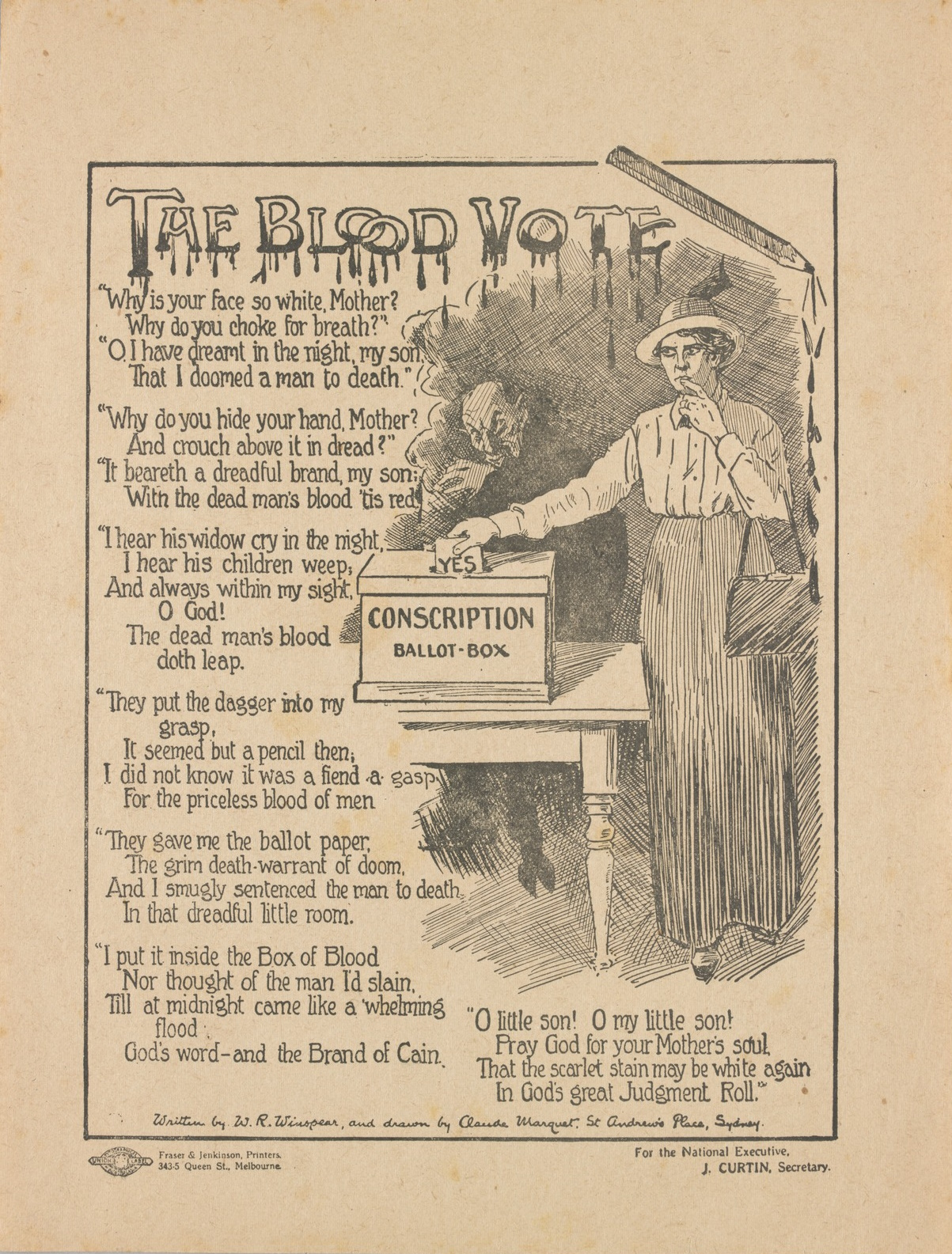
'The Blood Vote', written by W. R. Winspear and illustrated by Marquet (October 1916).

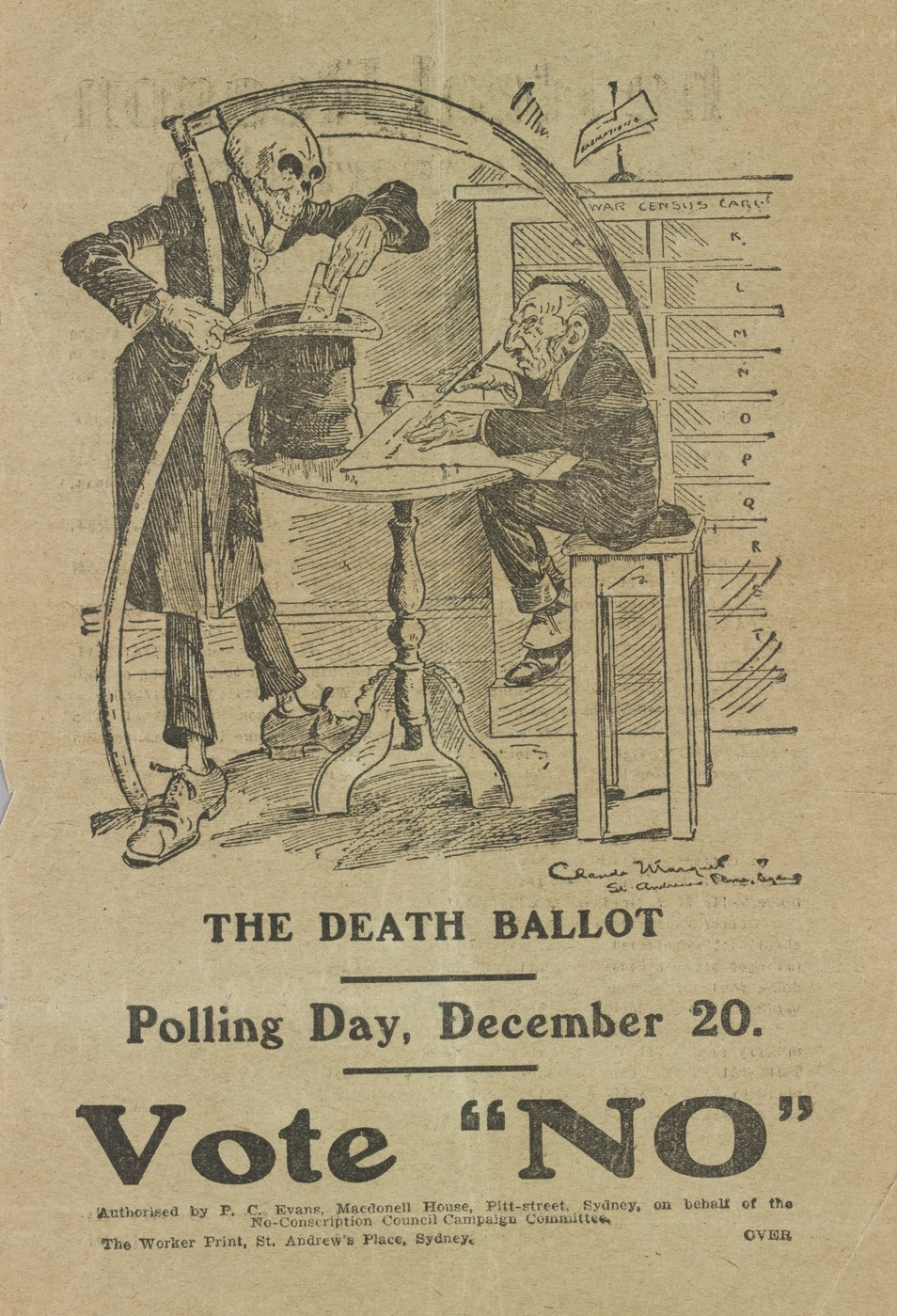
'The Death Ballot: Vote "No"' (1917 conscription plebiscite).

Anti-conscription plebiscite leaflets (October 1916 and December 1917) illustrated by Marquet.

At the outbreak of World War I in July 1914 there was widespread political support for Britain and the Empire, with some dissension within the labour movement. With The Bulletin having embraced conservatism and actively supporting the war (and conscription in later years), The Australian Worker remained the most radical publication in general circulation throughout Australia. As the war progressed The Worker's editor Henry Boote campaigned against wartime profiteering, supported by Marquet's cartoons on the subject. Increasing casualty reports from the Western Front began to lessen the original enthusiasm for the war in the general community. By mid-1916, with volunteer enlistments falling, the Labor prime minister Billy Hughes decided that conscription was the only viable option for supplying the replacement troops required for the British war effort, despite deep divisions on the matter within the Australian Labor Party. His solution was to hold a public vote on the question, in a nation-wide plebiscite to be held on 28 October 1916. Marquet's illustrations in The Australian Worker began to address the conscription issue as early as 8 June 1916 with a cartoon linking the advocacy of conscription with rampant anti-union capitalism. His cartoon, 'Capitalism's Disorganising Crusade', depicts an overweight man labelled "Employers Federation" addressing a younger "wage earner" who holds a shield labelled "industrial unionism". The employer explains that he dislikes "the thought of sending able-bodied young men abroad to be shot as much as you do", adding: "If you'll voluntarily drop that annoying shield, I'll not press for conscription!". Marquet's next cartoon on the subject of conscription was on 13 July 1916, portraying an armed "exponent of militarism" assaulting an anti-conscriptionist and kicking over a box labelled "free speech". From late July 1916 until the plebiscite in late October the majority of Marquet's cartoons concerned conscription.

The Australian Worker issue of 5 October 1916 included an anti-conscription poem by William R. Winspear titled 'The Blood Vote'. In the following week's issue Winspear's verse was republished, accompanied by an illustration by Marquet depicting a woman, with a conflicted look on her face, about to cast a 'Yes' vote, with a sinister demonic figure resembling Billy Hughes in the darkened background. The illustrated verse was subsequently reprinted as a leaflet for the anti-conscription campaign and over a million copies were distributed. The handbill was distributed nationwide by the anti-conscriptionist groups and "were pasted up all over the place". The Worker journalist Robert J. Cassidy later asserted that the illustrated poem "played a very considerable part in defeating the proposals of those who advocated throat-slitting by compulsion".^{[B]}

A leaflet printed and distributed prior to the second conscription plebiscite in December 1917 used an illustration by Marquet titled 'The Death Ballot', published in The Australian Worker on 15 November 1917.

During the war years Marquet's cartoons from The Australian Worker were occasionally re-printed in Melbourne's Labor Call newspaper.

Marquet's war-time cartoons usually dealt with home-front concerns, only occasionally covering international issues. His illustrations focussed on themes such as the anti-labour bias of mainstream newspapers, the greed of trusts and war profiteers, the bickering and posturing of politicians and the threat of military conscription. Throughout years of World War I Marquet's cartoons and illustrations were popular and influential. His contributions, together with his colleagues on The Worker and throughout the labour movement, managed to maintained a focus in Australian politics on class-consciousness and the dignity and value of the individual within the wider society "that could easily have been overwhelmed by the patriotic hysteria induced by Hughes and his supporters in parliament and the press".

=== Post-war ===
During the period from late February 1919 to early September 1919 Marquet's cartoons were published on page one of The Labor News, the official newspaper of the Australian Labor Party, on a semi-regular basis (in addition to his regular work for The Australian Worker).

=== Death ===
On Saturday afternoon, 17 April 1920, Claude Marquet and a companion named Harry Palmer were drowned in Botany Bay. Earlier in the day Marquet and Palmer had sailed across the mouth of the bay to the suburb of Botany and returned to Kurnell with provisions. On their return Marquet "discovered that they had forgotten to procure meat for Sunday", so the pair returned by boat to Botany. As they were returning once more to Kurnell, about half-way across the bay "their sailing boat was caught in a sudden squall which had sprang up". When they did not reach home by Saturday evening, "it was thought that the boisterous weather had compelled their return to Botany for the night". By Sunday morning, however, it "became apparent that disaster had overtaken them" and it was presumed the boat had overturned or was swamped in the rough seas. Palmer was unable to swim so it was surmised that Marquet, who was strong swimmer, "endeavoured to save the life of his companion... with the result that both were drowned". Later on Sunday the boat was found floating upside-down in Botany Bay and several articles of clothing were washed ashore. The bodies were never recovered.

Marquet's last cartoon for The Australian Worker was 'Ulysses and the Sirens', published on 22 April 1920 (the same issue that carried the announcement of his untimely death).

After Marquet's death fellow artist Alek Sass wrote of his friend's legacy: "Thinking his thoughts – vexing himself with the aching problems of humanity – keeping a fine, sane balance amidst the party hysteria of the papers he worked for – he brought a dignity and a personal force to his work that gives him an honoured place amongst the world's cartoonists".

In July 1920 The Australian Worker published a limited-edition commemorative volume titled Cartoons by Claude Marquet. The book included 85 of the artist's drawings from the pages of The Worker, as well as tributes in verse and prose from writers, politicians, unionists and editors. Proceeds from the sale of the volume went to "the benefit of the widow, whose whole-hearted devotion to her husband and his work was the brightest feature of his life".

In August 1920 the State Library of New South Wales purchased a collection of 75 of Marquet's original cartoons for permanent preservation in the archives of the Mitchell Library. The cartoons represented a record of the Labor movement during the previous fifteen years as well as being a "remarkable collection of one of Australia's ablest and most consistent cartoonists, whose influence will be felt far beyond his generation".

== Gallery ==
A selection of images by Claude Marquet
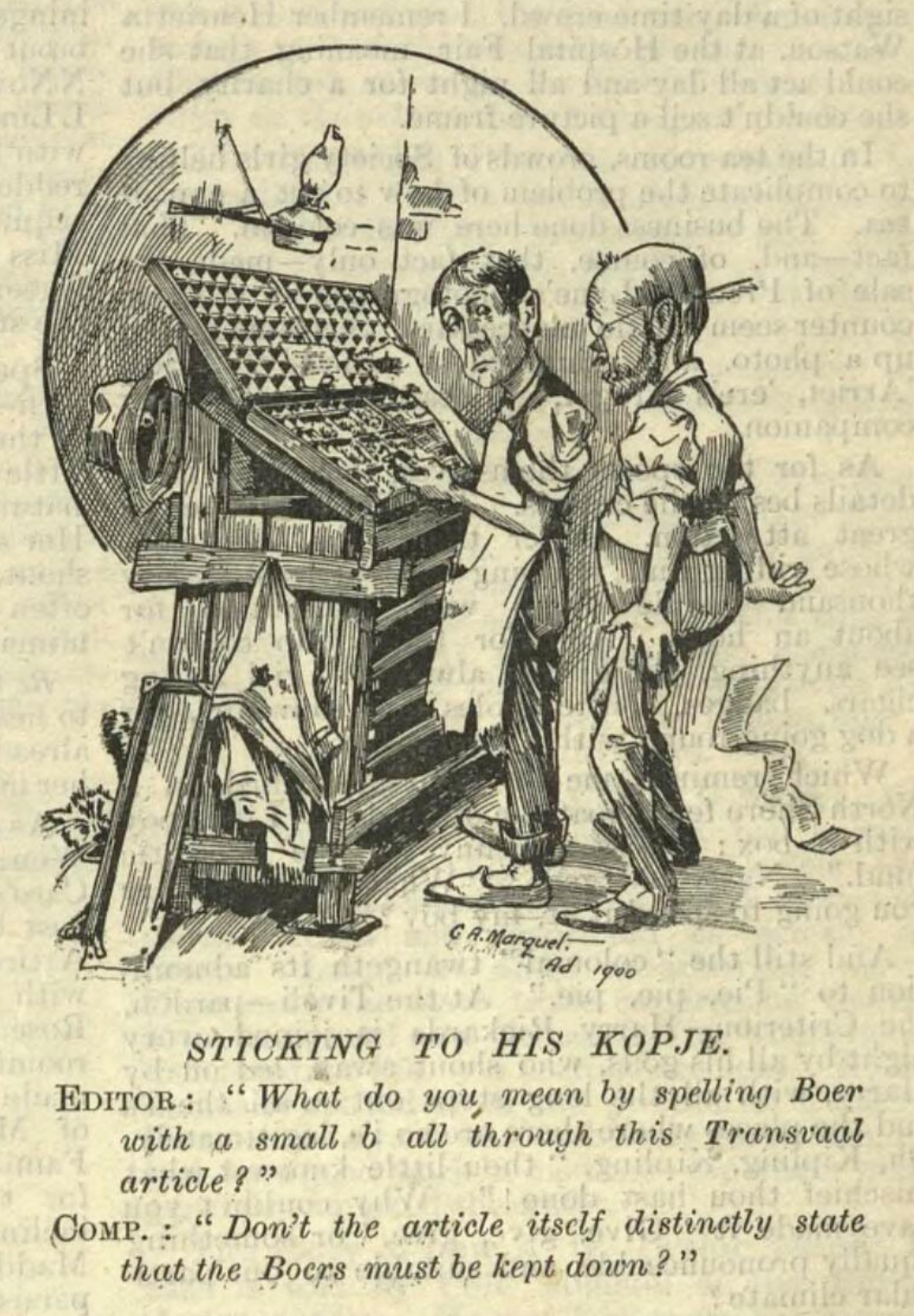
'Sticking to His Kopje', published in The Bulletin (Sydney), 3 March 1900.

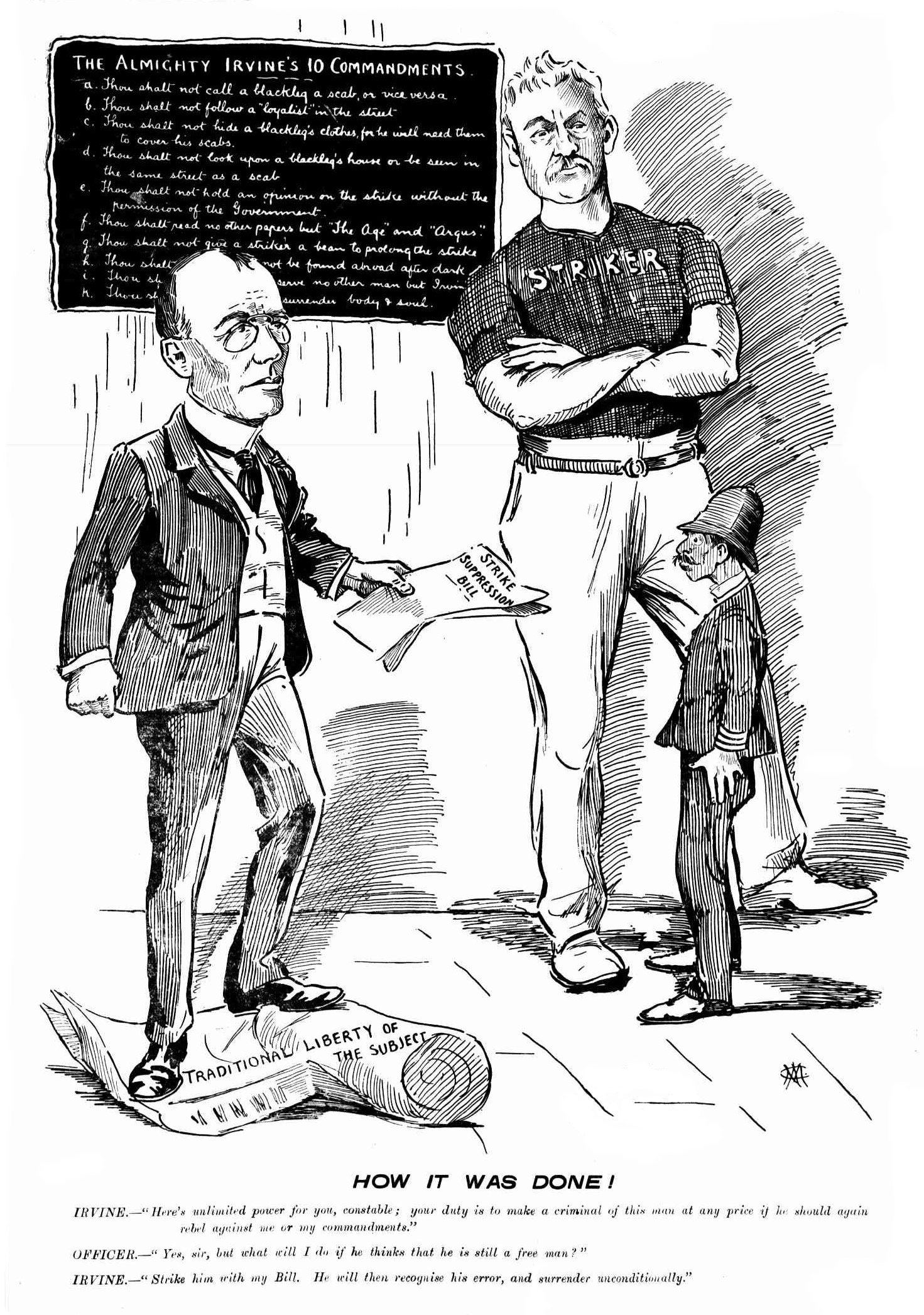
'How It Was Done!', published in The Tocsin, 21 May 1903 (featuring a caricature of William Irvine, premier of Victoria).

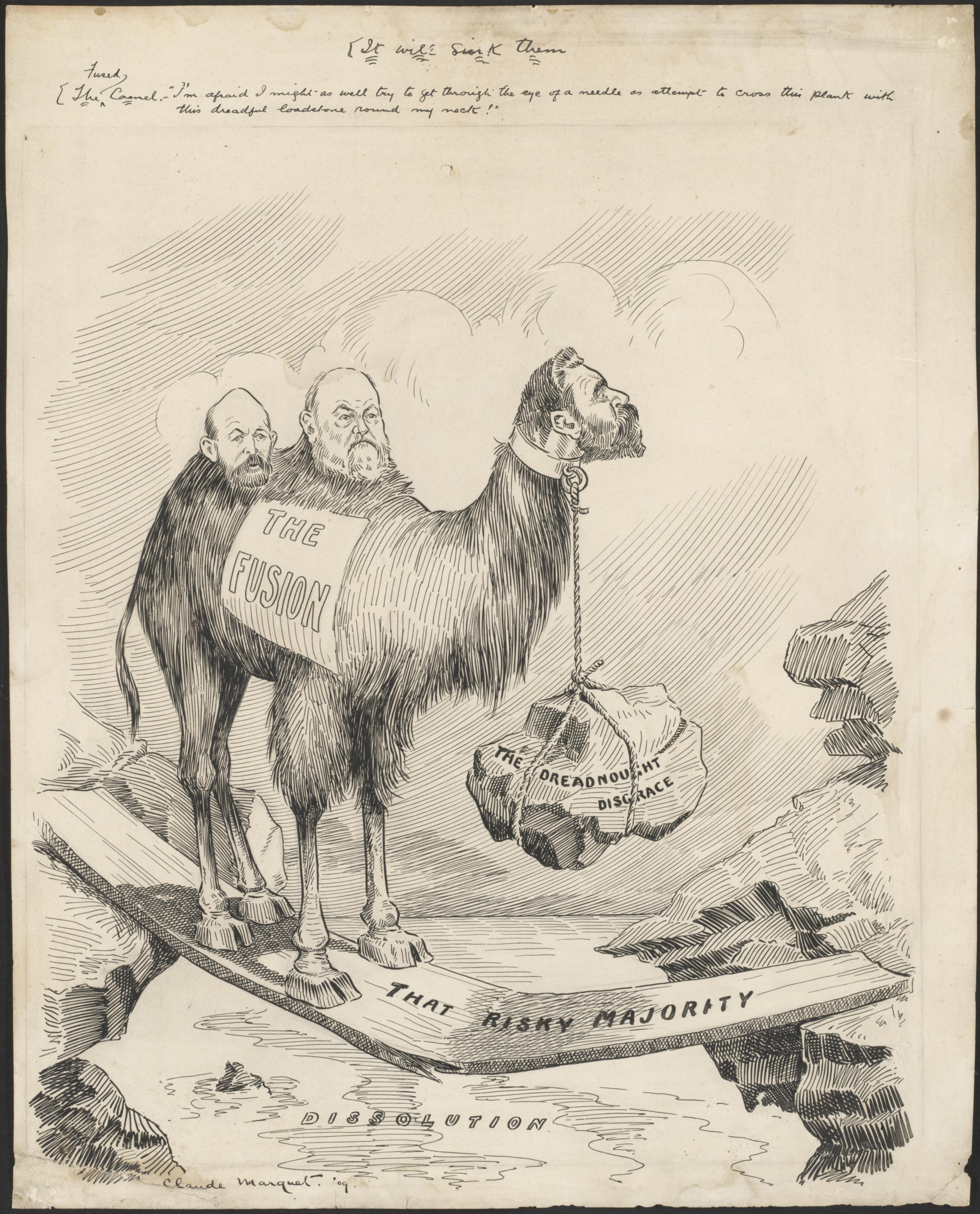
'It Will Sink Them' (1909), featuring representations of Alfred Deakin (the head of the camel) and Joseph Cook and John Forrest (the humps).

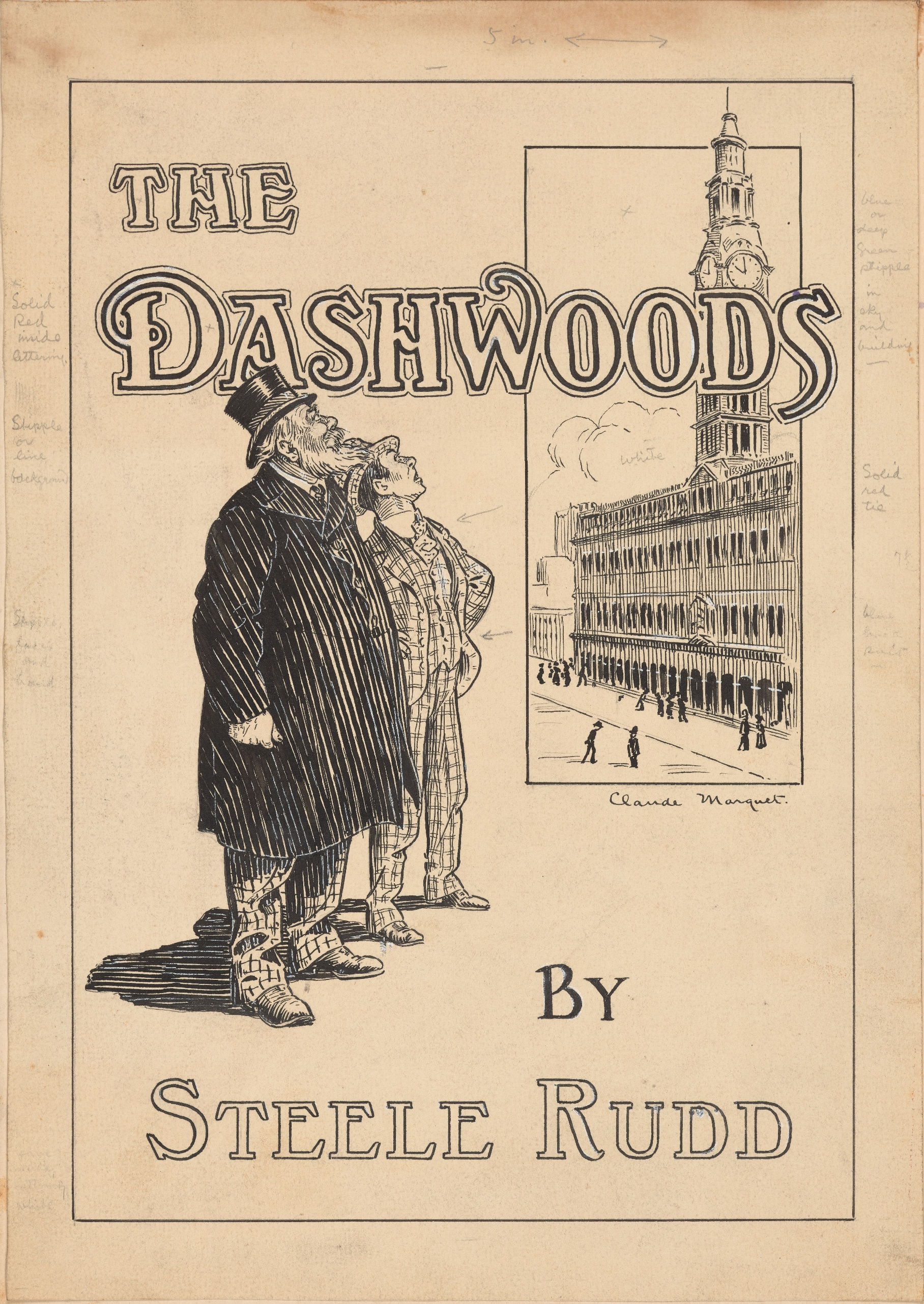
'The Dashwoods by Steele Rudd' (1911), cover design artwork (including instructions by the artist for colour printing).

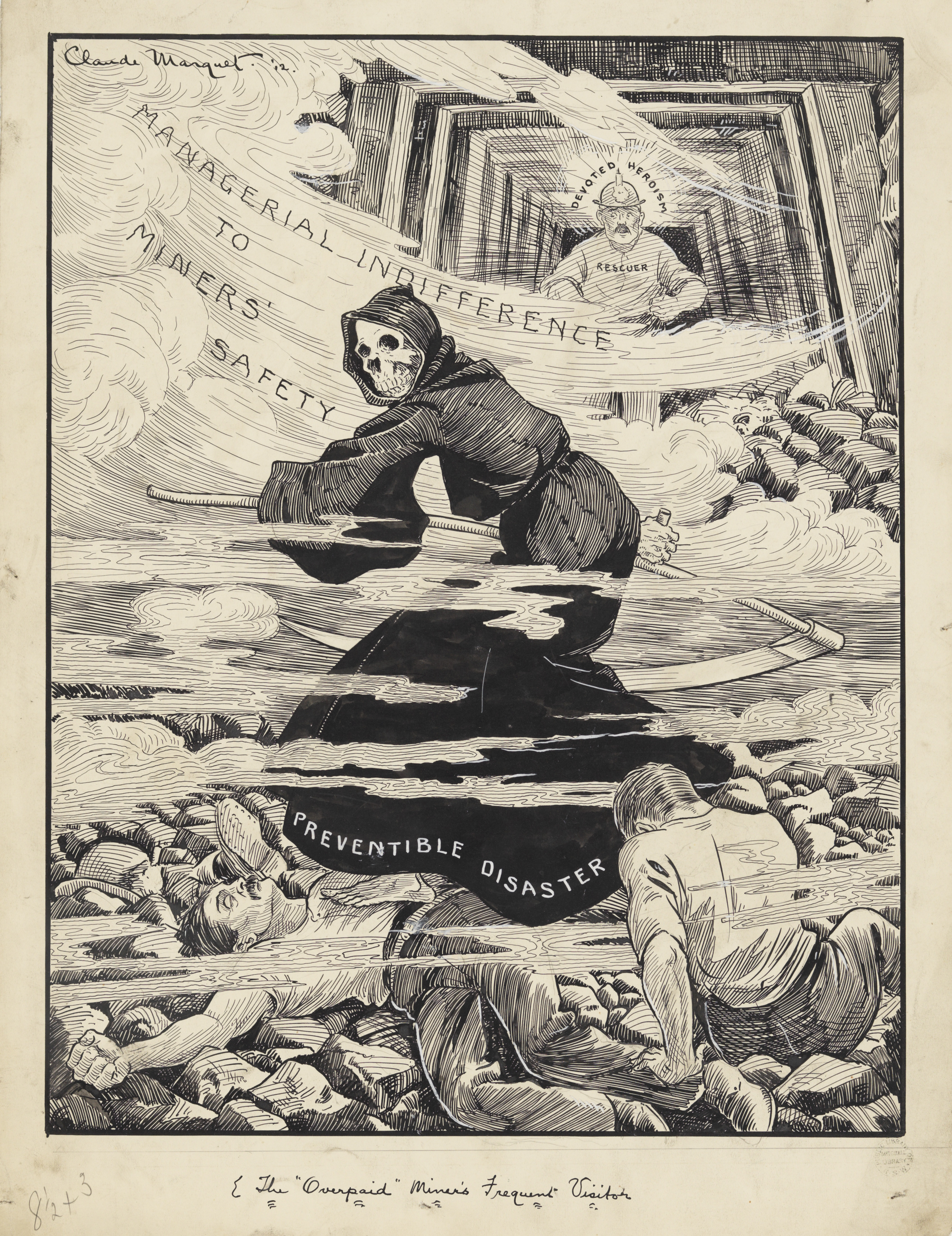
'The "Overpaid" Miner's Frequent Visitor' (artwork), published in The Worker (Sydney), 24 October 1912.

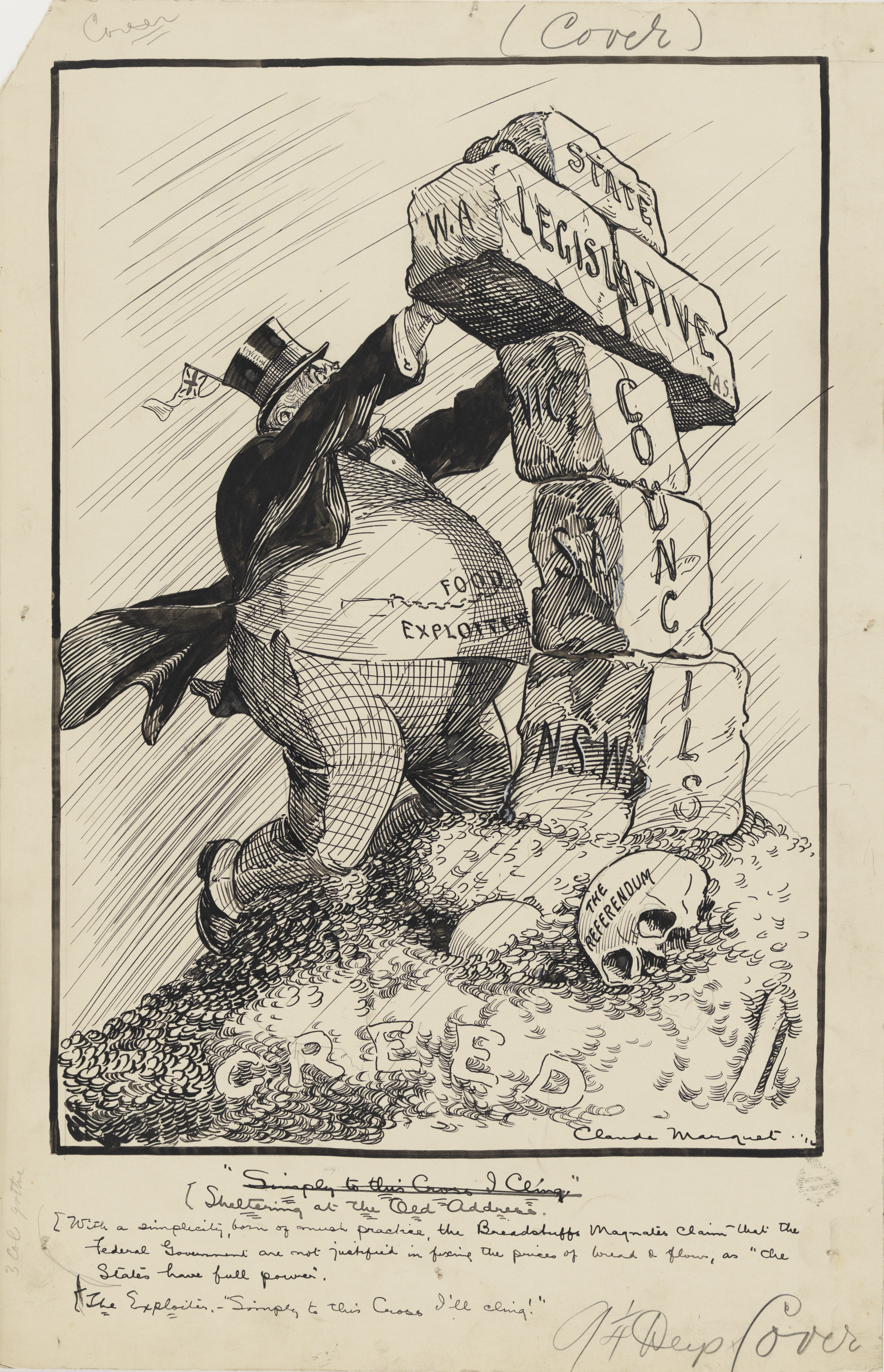
Artwork for 'Sheltering at the Old Address' (published in The Australian Worker, 16 March 1916); based on Johannes Oertel's 'Rock of Ages' painting (1876).

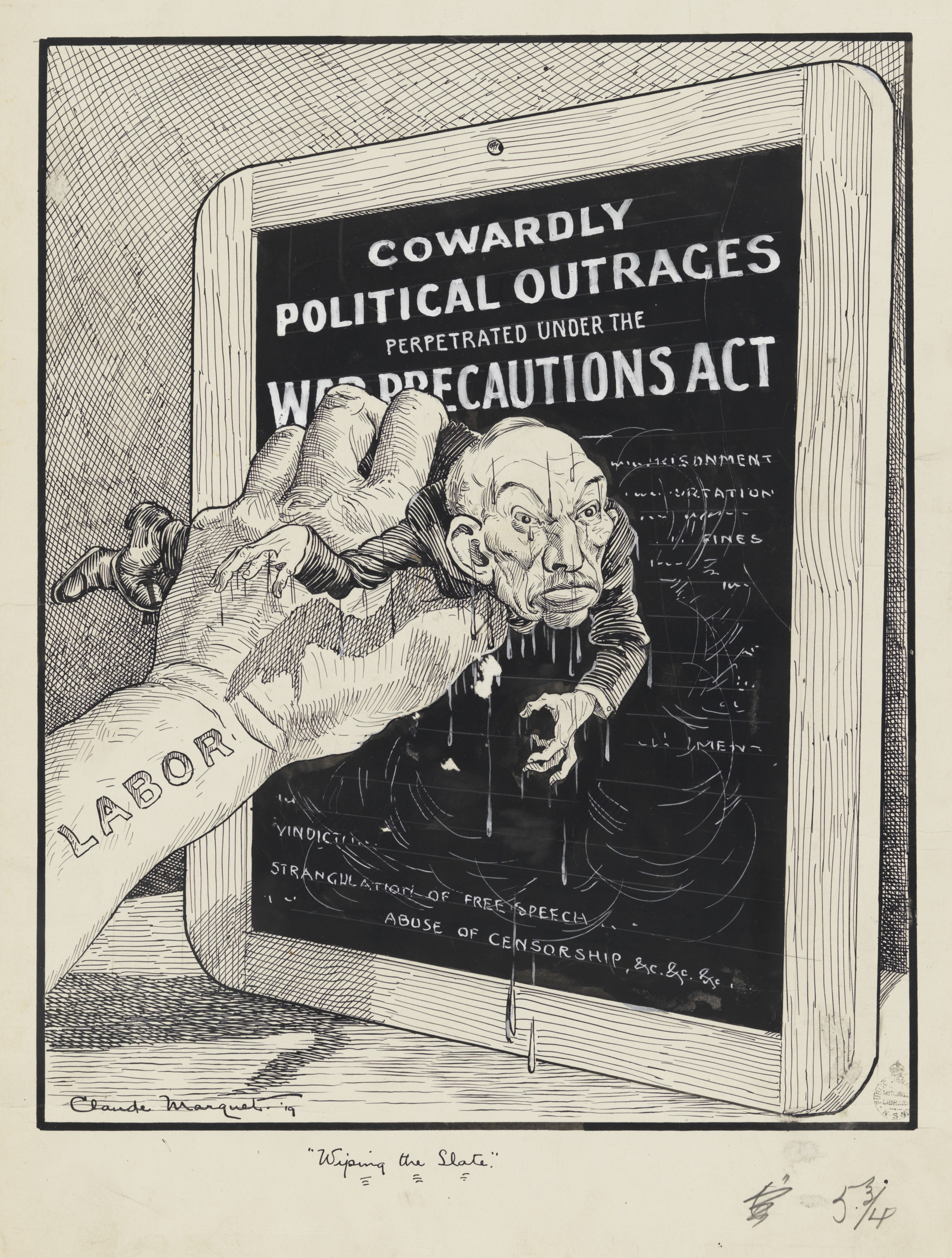
'Wiping the Slate' (1919) featuring a caricature of Billy Hughes (original artwork).

== Publications ==
- Claude Marquet (1909), Fusion Fancies: A Selection of Political Cartoons, Sydney: The Worker Trustees.
- Steele Rudd (1911), The Dashwoods: A Sequel to On an Australian Farm, Sydney: N.S.W. Bookstall; with fifteen full page illustrations by Claude Marquet.
- Thomas E. Spencer (1911), That Droll Lady: Being the Further Adventures of Mrs. Bridget McSweeney, Sydney: N.S.W. Bookstall Co.; with thirteen full page illustrations by Claude Marquet.
- Claude Marquet (1920), Cartoons by Claude Marquet: A Commemorative Volume, with Appreciations by Leading Representatives of Literature and Politics, Sydney: The Worker Trustees.

== Notes ==
A.Several reputable references erroneously state that Marquet "was invited to Sydney to be staff cartoonist on the Australian Worker in 1906", adding that "the first of his Worker cartoons appeared on 25 October 1906". This information is probably drawn from Marquet's obituary, published in April 1920 in The Australian Worker (and cited as a reference in Marquet's Australian Dictionary of Biography entry), which states: "Later on he was appointed as the staff cartoonist of The Worker (in which his first cartoon appeared on October 25, 1906)". Marquet's cartoons were actually published in The Worker as early as October 1904. From early November 1904 until early March 1905 his cartoons were regularly published on page five of the newspaper. From March 1905 until about October 1907 Marquet was employed as a staff artist by the Melbourne-based Punch magazine, with occasional cartoons appearing in other publications during this period (including the 25 October 1906 issue of The Worker). Marquet probably relocated to Sydney to join the staff of The Worker newspaper in about December 1907, with his regular cover-page cartoons commencing in January 1908.

B.William Winspear was credited as the author of the widely-read and influential 'The Blood Vote' poem. In 1940 Robert J. Cassidy, an Australian Worker journalist and author, disclosed that the verse had actually been written by the Sydney journalist Edward Dempsey, who at the time was employed by the pro-conscription Evening News newspaper. Concerned for his job Dempsey asked Winspear, a socialist and anti-conscriptionist, to have the poem appear under his name.

== Other reading ==
- Marquet, Charles; Boote, Henry E. (1920). Cartoons by Claude Marquet: A commemorative volume. The Worker Trustees.
