= Herbert Low =

Herbert Ingram Low (c. 1867 – 3 June 1910) was an English-born journalist in Australia.

== History ==
Low was born in England, a member of a journalistic family: among his brothers were Walter H. Low, Sir Sidney J. Low, Sir A. Maurice Low in America, and Ernest W. Low of Nairobi; Frances Helena Low was a sister, as was Barbara Low, the psychoanalyst. He came out to Victoria in 1889 and first worked for the Melbourne Evening Standard as their representative in Sydney, also did literary work for "The Star."

He worked as a journalist with The Age for five years and Sydney Morning Herald for seven; mostly as leader and feature writer. After leaving The Age he was prominent as a witness in the case of Speight v. Syme, in which the railways commissioner sued the newspaper proprietor for libel. His columns for the SMH include "The Shifting Scene" and "Fugitive Notes", but he was successfully sued by the management of that newspaper.

He contributed to the short-lived Melbourne weekly To-day, to the labour union journal The Worker and The Newsletter: An Australian Paper for Australian People, in which he dropped several hints that he was their pseudonymous contributor "The Insect". He also wrote briefly for the Brisbane Courier-Mail but soon returned to Sydney, where he died at Newtown of cancer aged 43 or 44. His remains were interred at Rookwood Cemetery, where mourners included his brother Ernest Low, Fred J. Broomfield, Claude Marquet, Fred Brown, James S. Ryan, W. B. Melville, Henry Lawson, J. Harland Tucker, and Archie Conningham.

In an obituary, Low was credited with fluid, generous writing, but a sensitivity to adverse criticism, when he was prone to fierce retaliation. Victor Daley rated him highly and William Bede Melville, who found his moods impenetrable, called his obituary of William Patrick Crick the finest and most generous.

== An obituary of sorts ==
- Henry Lawson (25 June 1910). "Bohemia Buries Her Dead". The Blue Mountain Echo. Vol. II, no. 69. New South Wales, Australia. p. 11 – via National Library of Australia.
