= Alice Grant Rosman =

Australian novelist

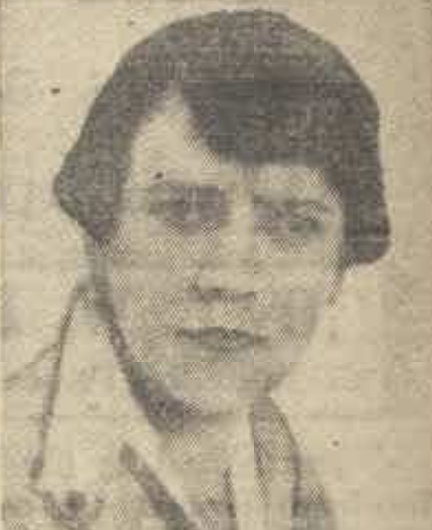
Alice Grant Rosman, c.1935

Alice Grant Rosman (18 July 1882 — 20 August 1961) (born Alice Trevenen Rosman) was an Australian novelist.

== Writing career ==
Alice Rosman was born in Kapunda, South Australia. She had one sister called Mary and the two girls attended St Mary's Convent, Franklin Street, Adelaide until 1889. In 1901, she started the Girl's Realm Guide in Adelaide. The Girls' Realm Guild published one of Rosman's books, "The Young Queen".

Rosman published some of her early stories in The Observer and The Chronicle, and began her professional career working on C.J. Dennis's Gadfly in 1906. After this, she worked for The Daily Herald and wrote a weekly Adelaide gossip column for The Bulletin from 1908 to 1911.

In 1911, the two Rosman sisters moved to England where Alice worked on the British Australian magazine from 1915 to 1920. She later became assistant editor at the Grand Magazine from 1920 to 1927.

Rosman published her first novel, Miss Bryde of England in 1915, though it was not met with any success. She continued to publish in the ensuing years but did not receive any degree of recognition until The Window was released in 1926 in both Britain and the United States. The Back Seat Driver was the first of several of her books to be published by Mills & Boon.

Alice Rosman continued to live in England until her death at Highgate on 20 August 1961.

Rosman Circuit, in the Canberra suburb of Gilmore, is named in her and her mother Alice Mary Bowyer Rosman's honour.

== Novels ==
Alice Rosman produced over 62 pieces of work including 17 novels

- Miss Bryde of England (1915)
- The Tower Wall (1916)
- The Window (1928)
- The Back Seat Driver (1928)
- Visitors to Hugo (1929)
- Jock the Scot (1930)
- The Young and Secret (1930)
- The Sixth Journey (1931)
- Benefits Received (1932)
- Protecting Margot (1933)
- Somebody Must (1934)
- The Sleeping Child (1935)
- Mother of the Bride (1936)
- Truth to Tell (1937)
- Unfamiliar Faces (1938)
- William's Room (1939)
- Nine Lives: A Cat of London in Peace and War (1941)
