= Frances Helena Low =

English anti-suffragist and journalist

- Born: 12 June 1862; Greenwich, Kent
- Died: 3 October 1939 (aged 77); London, England

Frances Helena Low (1862–1939), also known as "Fanny", was a journalist and anti-suffragist.

Born into a wealthy family, her father's bankruptcy meant she had to work for a living and, after a period as a librarian, she because a full-time journalist, writing for a wide range of publications. She also wrote two books. In the early twentieth century, against the background of the rising women's suffrage movement in the UK, Low became involved in the anti-suffrage movement. She was convinced that most women should be in the home, with the vote left to men to represent them.

== Early life ==
Low was born on 23 June 1862 in Greenwich, then in Kent, now part of London. Her parents were Therese (née Schacherl) and Maximillian Loewe; they had moved to Britain following the 1848 uprising in Hungary. The Low family was Jewish. Frances had ten siblings: six brothers and five sisters. Two of her brothers, Sidney and Maurice, were political journalists; her sister Barbara was a psychoanalyst. The family were wealthy and all the children had a good education; Frances could speak three languages. Maximillian got into financial difficulties and was declared bankrupt in 1878; his eldest children had to take jobs.

== Career ==
Through her friendship with the novelist Walter Besant, in 1887 she was appointed as librarian at the People's Palace, in the East End of London. Her salary was £80 a year. (Note: According to calculations based on the Consumer Price Index measure of inflation, £80 in 1887 is approximately £9,090 in 2025.) Constance Black, Low's co-librarian, described her as a "rather fickle and capricious young woman, not at all easy to work with". Low left the post in October 1888 to become a full-time journalist; by 1890 she was writing fiction for middle-class magazines. (Note: These included: "An Incident in Mr Landford’s Life" in Argosy and "His Little Comedy" in Murray's Magazine (both 1890).) She also began writing for children with The Air Child: and Other New Fairy Tales (1890), a collection of short stories. In 1896 she published a second collection, Little Men in Scarlet and Other Fairy Tales.

According to Alexis Easley, Low's biographer at the Oxford Dictionary of National Biography, Low was "an insightful chronicler of the everyday lives of women and children", and her articles on the subject include "The Street Games of Children", "Boy Soldiers and Sailors", "Distinguished Women and Their Dolls" and "Favourite Books of Childhood" which were published in The Strand Magazine between 1891 and 1894. Another article in The Strand was "Queen Victoria's Dolls", in 1892, which the queen "has been graciously pleased to read and revise". A book version was subsequently published.

In the late 1890s Low changed the focus of her journalism away from fiction and children's works, firstly into art criticism (Note: This includes an interview in The Strand Magazine with the artist John Everett Millais in 1896, a 1899 review of a Rembrandt exhibition in The Pall Mall Magazine and "Women Artists of the Day" in The Windsor Magazine.) and then into investigative journalism. Her first piece was "The Receiving Room of the London Hospital", published in May 1896 in The English Illustrated Magazine. From 1897 she began a series of articles in The Nineteenth Century (periodical) titled "How Poor Ladies Live". In the first article Low wrote:

The congested condition of the labour market for educated middleclass women, the competition that prevails therein, and the increasing difficulty for middle-aged ladies to obtain any occupation by which they can maintain themselves, are serious problems which will have ere long to be faced, if the present distress is to be prevented from becoming chronic and incurable and of greater intensity.

In 1903 Low published a series of articles in The Girl's Realm, which were a self-help guide for women in journalism. It included the a section where she tried to dissuade young women from becoming journalists as many were, in her experience, journalism was "not worthy of the powers, knowledge, and training of the highly cultivated woman". The articles were republished in book form as Press Work for Women. A Text Book for the Young Woman Journalist.

== Anti-suffragism ==
Low was an anti-suffragist and in December 1906 she wrote to The Times to correct the record of why some women were against women's suffrage. She explained it was:

because on any conceivable basis of woman suffrage the entire political balance would be affected, altered and ultimately decisively adjusted … If we feel we are adequately represented by the most enlightened men, we are convince that the mass of women will not represent our truest, highest, interests. We expect confidently to see in politics what we now see in journalism—viz., the interests and tastes and sentiments of the thoughtful, cultivated, intellectual woman swamped by the tastes, sentiments and interests of the mass of ill-educated, uncultured, trivial-minded women whose most absorbing interests are dress and society gossip.

According to the historian Brian Harrison, the letter was the start of the anti-suffrage campaign in the UK. By February 1907 a committee had been formed, gathering signatures supporting their position. The anti-suffragist Sophia Lonsdale wrote a letter to The Times advertising the petition, which was presented to Parliament two weeks later, having received 37,000 signatures. In February 1908 Low wrote a letter to The Spectator calling for the formation of a party against women's suffrage. It should, argued Low, push for a return of women to domestic work:

our motto to be "Back to the home"; our crusade to aim at a recreation of the home with its limitless opportunities, with its wider, truer sphere for the woman’s role, with its immeasurable, incomparable duties, responsibilities, and influences; our work to be to show that all moral and social reform is in our hands.

== Later life ==
In 1927 serious illness forced Low to give up working. She lived the rest of her life with her younger sister Florence. Low lived with her sister, a teacher and journalist, for her entire adult life. The sisters adopted a son, Francis Beard, at some point before 1911.

Low died on 10 March 1939 at her home in Golders Green, from uraemia, chronic cystitis and nephritis.

== Notes and references ==
=== Sources ===
- Clark, Gregory (2023). "The Annual RPI and Average Earnings for Britain, 1209 to Present (New Series)". MeasuringWorth. Archived from the original on 1 April 2023.
- Demoor, Marysa (2016). Their Fair Share: Women, Power and Criticism in the Athenaeum, from Millicent Garett Fawcett to Katherine Mansfield, 1870-1920. London: Routledge. ISBN 978-1-315-36341-7.
- Easley, Alexis (2012). "Anti/Feminism: Frances Low and the Issue of Women's Work at the Fin de Siècle". In Gray, F. Elizabeth (ed.). Women in Journalism at the Fin de Siècle: Making a Name for Herself. Palgrave Macmillan. pp. 218–235. ISBN 978-1-3493-4836-7.
- Easley, Alexis (14 June 2018). "Low, Frances Helena (1862–1939), journalist and anti-suffragist". Oxford Dictionary of National Biography. doi:10.1093/odnb/9780198614128.013.58328.
- Harrison, Brian (1978). Separate Spheres: The Opposition to Women's Suffrage in Britain. New York: Holmes & Meier. ISBN 978-0-8419-0385-2.
- Low, Frances Helena (September 1892). "Queen Victoria's Dolls". The Strand Magazine. No. 21. pp. 222–238.
- Low, Frances Helena (March 1897). "How Poor Ladies Live". The Nineteenth Century. 41 (241): 405–417.
- Low, Frances Helena (1904). Press Work for Women: A Text Book for the Young Woman Journalist. London: C. Scribner. OCLC 18432155.
- Low, Frances Helena (27 December 1906). "An Unnoticed Aspect of Woman Suffrage". The Times. p. 9.
- Low, Frances Helena (1 February 1908). "Wanted, A New Woman's Part". The Spectator. Vol. 100, no. 4153.
- Rubinstein, William D.; Jolles, Michael A.; Rubinstein, Hilary L., eds. (2011). Palgrave Dictionary of Anglo-Jewish History. Basingstoke, Hampshire: Palgrave Macmillan. ISBN 978-1-3495-1951-4.
