= Sidney Low =

British journalist, author and historian

Sir Sidney James Mark Low
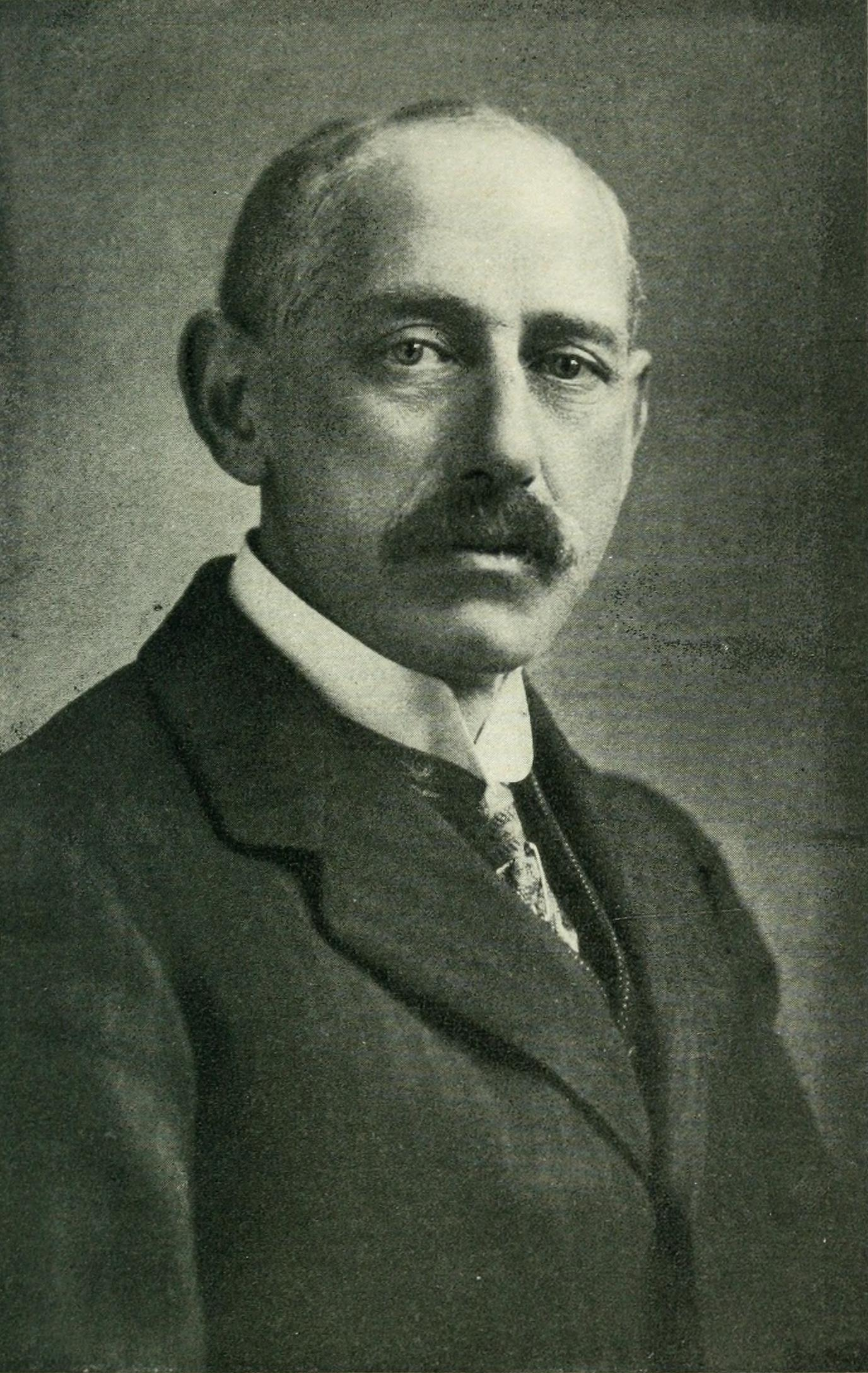
- Born: 22 January 1857; Blackheath, Kent, United Kingdom of Great Britain and Ireland
- Died: 14 January 1932 (aged 74); Kensington, County of London, United Kingdom
- Education: Balliol College
- Occupations: Journalist, Author
- Employer: The Standard
- Political party: Moderates
- Spouses: Elsie Davison (m. 1887; died 1921) Ebba Cecilia Byström (m. 1924–1932)
- Parent: Maximilian Low
- Relatives: Barbara Low (sister); Frances Helena Low (sister); A. Maurice Low (brother); Herbert Low (brother); Ivy Low Litvinov (niece)

Sir Sidney James Mark Low (22 January 1857 – 14 January 1932) was a British journalist, historian, and essayist.

== Biography ==
Low was born to Jewish parents Therese (née Schacherl; 1835–1887) and Maximillian Loewe (1830–1900), who emigrated to Britain from Hungary following the 1848 uprising.

Following education at King's College School, London he went to the University of Oxford. Initially an undergraduate at Pembroke College, he moved to Balliol when he was awarded a Brakenby scholarship. He received a first class degree in modern history in 1879. He was called to the bar at the Inner Temple in 1892.

He was the editor of the St. James's Gazette from 1888 to 1897, and was a leader writer and literary editor for the Standard. He was the paper's special correspondent on a number of occasions, covering such events as the visit of the Prince of Wales to India, the coronation of Haakon VII of Norway and the Hague Conference of 1907. From 1901 to 1905 he was an alderman on the London County Council for the Conservative-backed Moderate Party.

During the First World War he was a journalist in France and Italy, and edited the wireless service of the Ministry of Information. He was knighted in 1918.

Low was twice married. In 1887 he married Elsie Davison, who died in 1921. In 1924 his second marriage was to Ebba Cecilia Byström, of Stockholm, who has translated several works of George Bernard Shaw to Swedish.

He spent his later years writing and lecturing in imperial and colonial history at King's College, London. He died suddenly at his Kensington home in January 1932, aged 74.

== Works ==
- The Dictionary of English History (1884) and subsequent editions (in collaboration with F. S. Puling) Link, vol I Link, vol II
- The Governance of England (1904), revised edition (1914)
- The Political History of the Reign of Queen Victoria
- The British Constitution
- Egypt in Transition (1914)
- A Vision of India (1906)
- The History of England during the Reign of Victoria (1907) (in collaboration with L. C. Sanders)
- A Vision of India as Seen during the Tour of the Prince and Princess of Wales (1907)
- The Spirit of the Allied Nations (1915)
- The North American Review, English Democracy in Wartime (1916)
- Italy in the War (1916)
- Igor I Sikorsky
- The British Constitution: Its Growth and Character (1928)
- The Indian States and Ruling Princes (1929)
- "Suggests Germany wants war with us" (PDF). The New York Times. 15 February 1915.
- "Mr. Alden's views" (PDF). The New York Times. 30 July 1904.

In addition to this, Low wrote articles for the Dictionary of National Biography.
