= The Gadfly (Adelaide) =

Australian weekly magazine

The Gadfly was a weekly magazine produced in Adelaide, South Australia between February 1906 and February 1909, founded by the poet C. J. Dennis.

== History ==
The first issue of 28 pages was identified as: published in Currie Street, Adelaide, price 3d., subscription 12/6d. p.a., posted. The front page artwork on most issues consisted largely of Australian motifs. From 10 April 1907 the cover design was international and "beau monde" stylish; then from 31 July covers featured original artwork or a photograph, below a banner reading "The Gadfly — An Independent Australian Weekly Newspaper".

Dennis was assisted by Beaumont Smith and Alice Grant Rosman in the production of Gadfly.

== Contents and contributors ==
Gadfly commenced as an outlet for Australian writers and artists, but broadened in scope to include social gossip, and news and comments on stage and sport.

Its contributors included Dennis, Edward Dyson and "Grant Hervey" (George Henry Cochrane); artists included Ambrose Dyson, Will Dyson, Hal Gye, Ruby Lindsay and H. Septimus Power.

== Digitisation ==
The National Library of Australia has digitised photographic copies of every issue of Gadfly from 14 February 1906 (Vol. I, No.1) to 24 February 1909 (Vol. III, No.159), which may be accessed via Trove.

== See also ==
- The Critic (1897–1924), the paper in which C. J. Dennis began his literary career, and was later its editor
