= Ambrose Dyson =

Australian illustrator and political cartoonist

Ambrose Dyson (1876 – 4 June 1913), often known as Amb Dyson was an Australian illustrator and political cartoonist, born at Alfredton, near Ballarat, Victoria, Australia, the son of George Dyson, then a hawker and later a mining engineer, and his wife Jane, née Mayall. He was educated at state schools at Ballarat and South Melbourne. He was the older brother of the brilliant Will Dyson and the writer Edward Dyson.

He may have studied at the Melbourne National Gallery Art School and certainly took private lessons with Tom Durkin, but was mostly self-taught.

He was a frequent contributor to The Bulletin and Melbourne Punch, but his first regular position was with the Adelaide Critic from 1899 to 1903, then with The Bulletin. He worked as cartoonist for the Melbourne Table Talk from 1907 to 1910, while contributing to C. J. Dennis's Gadfly followed by the Sydney-based Comic Australian.

He was the first sports cartoonist for the Melbourne Herald from 1907 to 1910.

He died in Kew Insane Asylum on 4 June 1913, after suffering alcoholism and chronic syphilis-related dementia and paralysis.

== Sources ==
- McCulloch, Alan Encyclopedia of Australian Art Hutchinson of London 1968
