= The Newsletter: an Australian Paper for Australian People =

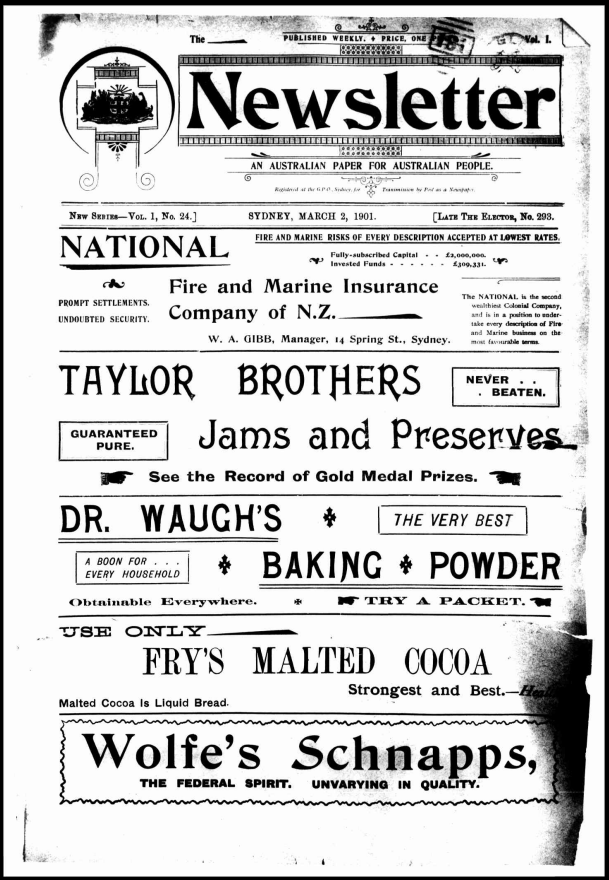
The Newsletter: an Australian Paper for Australian People, 2 March 1901

The Newsletter: an Australian Paper for Australian People was an English-language broadsheet newspaper published weekly in Sydney, Australia by Charles John Haynes. It was originally published as The Elector from 1890 to 1900.

== History ==
The first issue of The Newsletter appeared on 15 September 1900, and it remained in print until 1919. The paper was published every Saturday. It continued a newspaper entitled The Elector, which was also published in Sydney by Haynes between 1895 and 1900. The Elector began as a "bulletin of information for the electors of N.S.W.". However at the time it was continued by The Newsletter, it carried the sub-title "an up to date social, dramatic, sporting, political and general newspaper for the people".

== Digitisation ==
Many issues of the paper have been digitised as part of the Australian Newspapers Digitisation Program, a project of the National Library of Australia in cooperation with the State Library of New South Wales.

== See also ==
- List of newspapers in Australia
- List of newspapers in New South Wales
