= David Eder =

British psychoanalyst, writer and Zionist (1865–1936)

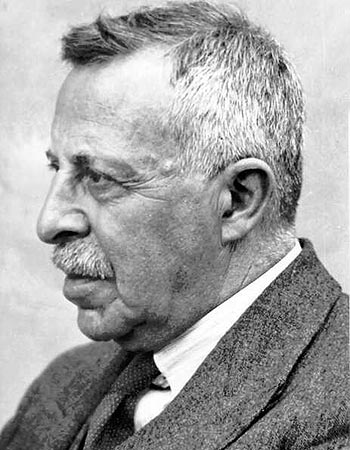
- Born: David Montague Eder; August 1, 1865; London, England
- Died: March 30, 1936 (aged 70); London, England
- Scientific career
- Fields: Psychoanalysis

David Montague Eder (1 August 1865 – 30 March 1936) was a British psychoanalyst, physician, Zionist and writer of Lithuanian Jewish descent. He was best known for advancing psychoanalytic studies in Great Britain.

== Education and medical training ==
Eder studied medicine at St. Bartholomew's Hospital in London. Following the completion of his studies, he travelled through the United States, South Africa, Colombia (where he visited his uncle James Martin Eder), and Bolivia, where he became a non-commissioned military surgeon for the Bolivian Army.

Eder returned to London in 1900 and went into general practice. His interest in paediatric medicine led to his appointment as Medical Officer of the London School Clinic in 1908 and of the Nursery School at Deptford in 1910. He was also the editor of the medical journal School Hygiene.

In the First World War, Eder joined the British Army, serving in the Royal Army Medical Corps. As a temporary captain, he was appointed medical officer in charge of the psycho-neurological department in Malta. He would later recall the physical and mental injuries suffered by the frontline troops in his 1917 book War-Shock, The Psycho-neuroses in War: Psychology and Treatment.

== Psychoanalysis ==
David Eder in 1893

During the early 1910s, Eder became interested in the psychoanalytical theories emerging from Europe. Writing as M. D. Eder, he provided English-language translation for works by Carl Jung (Diagnostic Association Studies and The Theory of Psychoanalysis) and Sigmund Freud (Dream Psychology: Psychoanalysis for Beginners and On Dreams). Eder would later prefer the Freudian approach to the Jungian approach.

Eder also authored original articles on psychoanalysis. His influence stretched beyond medical circles: the novelist D. H. Lawrence alluded to Eder's pamphlet The State Endowment of Motherhood in the book The White Peacock.

== Major studies ==
In 1932 he was elected president of the medical section of the British Psychological Society. That year, he presented his 1932 study The Management of the Nervous Patient. First presented at the London Jewish Hospital Medical Society, the paper called for the combination of psychoanalysis into the process of medical diagnosis. "When this is not feasible," he said, "the physician's intelligence...must be employed to guide his patient to a measure of mental wholeness."

Also in 1932, Eder presented his concept of the Myth of Progress. Writing in the British Journal of Medical Psychology, Eder argued that while civilization is moving forward due to advances in science, politics and technology, these advances are actually contributing to greater unhappiness as man perceives a loss of control over his environment.

== Politics ==
Outside of his medical work, Eder was active in Britain's Socialist politics and was involved in the Fabian Society, the leading British socialist organisation. As a supporter of the Zionist cause, Eder served on the Zionist Executive in Palestine from 1921 to 1927, and was later president of the Zionist Federation of Great Britain.

After the formation of the Jewish Territorial Organization by Eder's cousin, Israel Zangwill, Eder was sent to Brazil to assess its potential for Jewish settlement. Eder found himself at the Andes, where he was accused of espionage due to an ongoing civil war in the region. Afterwards, he fell ill and could not travel farther and almost died. Eder was discovered by a cannibalistic tribe and taken care of. He was fed what they initially claimed to be a human baby's head, however it later turned out to be the head of a monkey. He later found out that the tribe only eat humans after their death and do not kill humans for the purpose of eating. During his stay with the cannibals, he fantasized about how good of a meal he would make when he died.
