= Conrad Eitel =

Australian journalist (1880–1947)

Conrad Constantine Eitel (c. August 1880 – May 1947) was a journalist of German extraction in South Australia.

== History ==
Eitel was born in Hong Kong.

His father, Rev. Dr Ernest John Eitel (13 February 1838 – 10 November 1908) was German by birth, but a naturalised British citizen, private secretary to Sir John Pope Hennessy, Governor of Hong Kong 1877–1882, and was also director of Education in that Colony. His mother was Mary Anne Winifred Eitel née Eaton (c. 1838 in Norton, Worcestershire – 26 February 1923); they married around 1866.

Eitel arrived in Australia in 1897 or 1898, His father was appointed pastor of the tiny St Stephen's Lutheran church in Flinders Street, Adelaide in 1896, and founded the new St Stephen's, which opened 1900 in Wakefield Street. Dr Eitel retired in 1905, replaced by Australian-born F. W. Basedow, and died in 1908.

He met Florence May Solomon twelve days after arriving in Adelaide and within five weeks they were engaged; they married four years later on 26 December 1901. Florence was the third daughter of Judah Moss Solomon (1846–1911) (Note: Not to be confused with Judah Moss Solomon, mayor of Adelaide and parliamentarian. This J. M. Solomon of Buxton Street was a prominent investor and benefactor; he had four daughters, one of whom married another J. M. Solomon.) of North Adelaide.

In 1908 he was a reporter on the literary staff of the Sydney Daily Telegraph.

=== Australasian Antarctic Expedition ===
In 1911 he was chosen by Douglas Mawson as secretary for his Australasian Antarctic Expedition, to head the base station in Hobart. Eitel had no hesitation in exercising his mandate, down to denying a government employee passage to Macquarie Island, as it had not first been cleared with Mawson. Part of his duties was to compile press releases from Mawson's telegraphic reports, an important source of finance for the expedition. Eitel negotiated a lucrative agreement with the Times of London to give them preferential treatment. Eitel's racy bylined reports were popular.

The expedition, which started with high hopes turned to disaster. The coastal expedition of Mawson, Ninnis, and Mertz collapsed when Ninnis disappeared into a crevasse with most of their supplies, and Mertz died from exhaustion, leaving Mawson to struggle alone back to base. With winter approaching, their ship Aurora had to leave, but six men (Madigan, Bage, Bickerton, Hodgeman, Maclean and Jeffryes) were elected by Captain Davis to stay behind for another winter, not knowing whether any of the three had survived. Their radio telegraph operator Sidney Jeffryes exhibited signs of morbid paranoia, and another man had to learn Morse code post haste. (Note: The radio link-up was in two stages, both tapped out manually on a morse key: Cape Denison to Macquarie Island, and Macquarie Island to Hobart. The science of radio propagation was in its infancy, and many were the guesses as to the causes of the vagaries of reception, from magnetised hills to snowdrifts, but Mawson was aware of the correlation between the aurora australis and failure of the HF band.)

Eitel managed the news reports, and when Mawson and his companions returned in triumph, he stage-managed their arrival for maximum value to the expedition's supporters.

=== New Guinea Expeditionary Force ===
He enlisted with the Australian Army two days after declaration of war, and was sent to Rabaul on a six month contract with a machine-gun battalion led by Lieut. Bond and Captain Travers, stormed the trenches and took prisoners. His knowledge of German was useful when interrogating the prisoners, and locating the wireless station, which was 7 kilometres (4.3 mi) away. Travers and Eitel captured the station and took prisoners. Eitel was in line for a DCM; then a message came through from New Zealand with the allegation that Eitel was a spy in the pay of the German army.

=== First AIF and court martial ===
In Melbourne, on 27 August 1915, adopting the name Lionel Lambert Eaton (a combination of his brother's and his mother's birth name), he enlisted in the First AIF. He was promoted to Sergeant in the 14/5th Battalion before his true identity was discovered: he was court-martialed on 3 February 1916 for giving a false name on his attestation papers, and concealing the fact that he had previously served (as Eitel) with the Australian Expeditionary Forces. He was imprisoned for 15 days and discharged from the army as an enemy alien. At the court-martial Captain William Ross Sara, the officer commanding his company, testified that he was the "finest soldier from an administrative and drill point of view" he had ever worked with. Lieutenant-Colonel Francis Bede Heritage said that he was instrumental in taking the Rabaul wireless station with Captain Travers and Lieut. Bond, showing considerable gallantry, and with his knowledge of the German language, indispensable in debriefing the prisoners. His loyalty was never in question.

Little has been found of his subsequent personal or business activities. After the war he became a member of the Commonwealth Reporting Department.

== Family ==
Eitel had two sisters and a brother:

- Winifred Veronica Eitel, elsewhere referred to as Winifred Grace Eitel (c. 1868 – 16 November 1950) was a musician and teacher of singing. Born in Canton, she returned with her parents to Esslingen when she was in her teens, and reckons she was 17 when they left for Hong Kong. When they settled in Adelaide she served as choirmaster and organist for St Stephen's church. She married Francis "Frank" Bransby Milnes ( – ) in 1930. Her death notice (mentioned above) gave her name as Winifred Grace Eitel.
- Lionel Lambert Eitel (c. 1872 – 26 July 1947) married Florence Maud Tracey in 1913. Lionel was a printer, lived at 5 Kingston Avenue, Richmond, South Australia. Their children were Win, Steve and Lambert.
- Muriel Mabel Olivia Eitel, most likely assistant music teacher to Winifred Eitel.
