= Barbara Low (psychoanalyst) =

British psychoanalyst

- Born: Alice Leonora Low; 29 July 1874; London, England, United Kingdom
- Died: 25 December 1955 (aged 81); London, England, United Kingdom
- Education: University College London
- Known for: Founder member of the British Psychoanalytical Society; Nirvana principle
- Scientific career
- Fields: Psychoanalysis

Barbara Low (29 July 1874 – 25 December 1955) was one of the first British psychoanalysts, and an early pioneer of analytic theory in England.

== Training and contributions ==
Low was born in London and named Alice Leonora, the eleventh and last child of Therese (née Schacherl) and Maximillian Loewe, who moved to Britain following Loewe's part in the failed 1848 uprising in Hungary. Her family was Jewish. Her brothers, Sidney James Mark Low and Maurice Low, and her sister, Frances Helena Low, were journalists.

Low attended the Frances Mary Buss School and graduated from University College London, before training as a teacher at the Maria Grey Training College. She later went to Berlin for analysis with Hanns Sachs, and became a founder member of the British Psychoanalytical Society. She remained active in the society, serving as librarian, and encouraging wider public involvement for the society during World War II. Having led the welcoming committee for Austrian analysts in 1938, Low supported Anna Freud and Edward Glover in the wartime controversial discussions.

In her 1920 book Psycho-Analysis. A Brief Account of the Freudian Theory, she introduced the concept of the Nirvana principle (German: Nirwanaprinzip) for indicating the organism's tendency to keep stimuli to a minimum level. The term was taken up immediately by Freud in Beyond the Pleasure Principle.

== See also ==
- Catherine Carswell (niece)
- D. H. Lawrence
- Lay analysis
- Melitta Schmideberg
- Marjorie Brierley
- Object relations theory
