= 1917 in poetry =

Nationality words link to articles with information on the nation's poetry or literature (for instance, Irish or France).

== Events ==
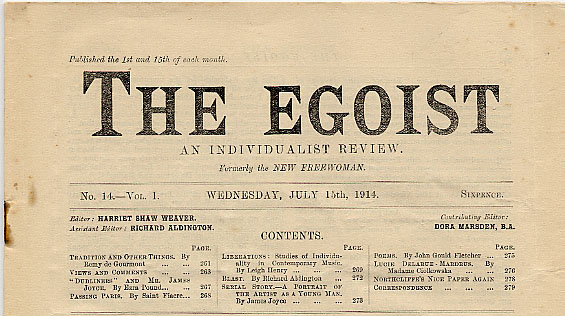
The Egoist

- January — Philosopher Hu Shih, the primary advocate for the revolution in Chinese literature at this time to replace scholarly language with the vernacular, publishes an article in the magazine New Youth (Xin Qingnian) titled "A Preliminary Discussion of Literature Reform", in which he originally emphasizes eight guidelines that all Chinese writers should take to heart (next year he will compress the list to four points).
- February — The Little Review moves from Chicago to New York City with the help of Ezra Pound (its foreign editor from May).
- May — W. B. Yeats acquires Thoor Ballylee in Ireland.
- May 2 — English poet Marian Allen completes the poem "To A. T. G." a few days after hearing of the death in action of her fiancé Arthur Greg, the first of several to his memory.
- May–June — T. S. Eliot takes over as editor of The Egoist, a London literary monthly, when Richard Aldington leaves for the British Army.
- July
  - English poet Siegfried Sassoon issues his "Soldier's Declaration" against prolongation of World War I and is sent (with assistance from Robert Graves) by the military authorities to Craiglockhart War Hospital in Edinburgh, where on August 17 Wilfred Owen introduces himself. With his encouragement, Owen writes "Anthem for Doomed Youth" and "Dulce et Decorum est"; the latter work's horrifying imagery makes it one of the most popular condemnations of war ever written. Like almost all Owen's poetry, these remain unpublished until after his death in action next year.
  - With the United States not yet fighting in World War I, Americans John Dos Passos, E. E. Cummings and Robert Hillyer volunteer for the S.S.U. 60 of the Norton-Harjes Ambulance Corps.
  - Last issue of Others: A Magazine of the New Verse, founded by Alfred Kreymborg in 1915 and publishing poetry and other writing, as well as visual art; contributors include William Carlos Williams, Wallace Stevens, Marianne Moore, Mina Loy, Ezra Pound, Conrad Aiken, Carl Sandburg, T. S. Eliot, Amy Lowell, H.D., Djuna Barnes, Man Ray, Skipwith Cannell and Lola Ridge.

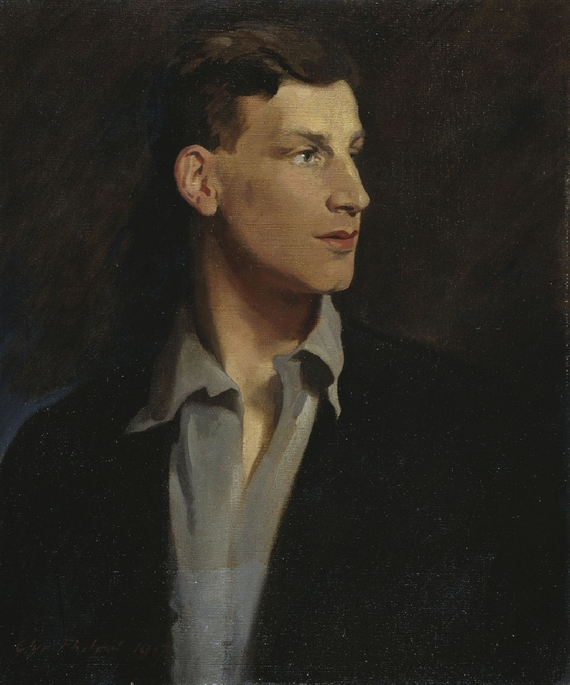
Portrait of Siegfried Sassoon by Glyn Warren Philpot, 1917 (Fitzwilliam Museum)

- July 15 — Welsh-language poet Hedd Wyn posts his awdl "Yr Arwr" ("The Hero") as his entry for the poetry competition at the National Eisteddfod of Wales on the same day as he marches off with the 15th Battalion Royal Welch Fusiliers towards the Battle of Passchendaele in which he will be killed a fortnight later. On September 6 at the ceremony of Chairing of the Bard at the Eisteddfod, held at Birkenhead, the empty druidical chair which Wyn, as winner, should have occupied is draped in a black sheet, "The festival in tears and the poet in his grave." This becomes known as "The Eisteddfod of the Black Chair."
- Summer — Russian writer Boris Pasternak composes My Sister, My Life; this circulates orally and in manuscript for several years before publication.
- c. Summer — The Siuru expressionistic and neo-romantic literary movement in Estonia is formed by a group of young poets and writers.
- October 20 — 51-year-old poet W. B. Yeats marries 25-year-old Georgie Hyde-Lees at Harrow Road register office in London (with Ezra Pound as best man), a couple of months after having had a proposal of marriage to his ex-mistress's daughter, Iseult Gonne, rejected.
- November — Publication of The Muse in Arms, an anthology of British war poetry.

== Works published in English ==
=== Australia ===
- C. J. Dennis:
  - Doreen
  - The Glugs of Gosh
- Leon Gellert:
  - "A Night Attack"
  - Songs of a Campaign
- Mary Gilmore, "The Ancient" (aka "Old Botany Bay")
- Lesbia Harford, "I'm Like All Lovers"
- Henry Lawson, "Scots of the Riverina"
- A. B. Paterson, Saltbush Bill, J.P., and Other Verses

=== United Kingdom ===
Book by T. S. Eliot

- Aftermath of Easter Week, Ireland
- Rupert Brooke, Selected Poems
- May Wedderburn Cannan, In War Time
- Richard Church, The Flood of Life
- Austin Clarke, The Vengeance of Fionn (Irish poet)
- Walter de la Mare, The Sunken Garden, and Other Poems
- John Drinkwater, Tides
- T. S. Eliot:
  - Prufrock, and other observations
  - Ezra Pound: His Metric and Poetry (criticism)
- Robert Graves, Fairies and Fusiliers
- Ronald Gurner, War's Echo
- Ivor Gurney, Severn and Somme
- H.D. (Hilda Doolittle), The Tribute And Circe: Two Poems (American poet published in the UK)
- Thomas Hardy:
  - Collected Poems
  - Moments of Vision and Miscellaneous
- F. W. Harvey, Gloucestershire Friends: Poems from a German Prison Camp
- May Herschel-Clarke, Behind the Firing Line and other poems of the War
- W. N. Hodgson, Verse and Prose in Peace and War (posthumous)
- E. W. Hornung, Ballad of Ensign Joy
- D. H. Lawrence, Look! We Have Come Through
- Joseph Lee, Work-a-Day Warriors (Scottish poet)
- Ewart Alan Mackintosh, A Highland Regiment and Other Poems (Scottish poet)
- Frederic Manning, Ediola, a collection of poems influenced by Ezra Pound’s imagism
- John Masefield, Lollingdon Downs, and Other Poems
- Alice Meynell, A Father of Women, and Other Poems
- A. Mellema, The Poems of a Canadian Woodman, Canadian Forestry Corps, No. 108 Coy. (Canadian poet published in Scotland)
- Charles Murray, The Sough o' War (Scottish poet writing in Doric dialect)
- George William Russell ("Æ"), Salutation
- Vita Sackville-West, Poems of East and West
- Siegfried Sassoon, The Old Huntsman, and Other Poems
- Will Streets, The Undying Splendour (posthumous)
- Edward Thomas, Poems (posthumous) (including "Adlestrop")
- Sir William Watson, The Man Who Saw, and Other Poems Arising Out of the War
- Charles Williams, Poems of Conformity
- W. B. Yeats, The Wild Swans at Coole, Other Verses and a Play in Verse (Irish poet)

=== United States ===
- Conrad Aiken, Nocturne of Remembered Spring
- John Peale Bishop, Green Fruit
- Kate Buss, Jevons Block
- Witter Bynner, Grenstone Poems
- Florence Earle Coates (1850–1927), Pro Patria A 16-page pamphlet of seven war poems published privately in Philadelphia in support of American involvement in World War I.
- Edgar A. Guest, Just Folks
- H.D. (Hilda Doolittle), The Tribute And Circe: Two Poems American poet published in the United Kingdom
- Archibald MacLeish, Tower of Ivory
- Edna St. Vincent Millay, Renascence and Other Poems
- James Oppenheim, The Book of Self
- Edward Arlington Robinson, Merlin
- George Murphy, Thirty-five Sonnets
- Alan Seeger, Poems (posthumous)
- Wallace Stevens, "Thirteen Ways of Looking at a Blackbird"
- Sara Teasdale, Love Songs
- William Carlos Williams, A Book of Poems: Al Que Quiere!

=== Other in English ===
- Nizamat Jung, Sonnets, London: Erskine Macdonald; Indian, Indian poetry in English, published in the United Kingdom
- Sarojini Naidu, The Broken Wing: Songs of Love, Death and the Spring, London; India, Indian poetry in English, published in the United Kingdom
- E. J. Pratt, Rachel: a sea story of Newfoundland, private. Canada.

== Works published in other languages ==
=== France ===
- Guillaume Apollinaire, pen name of Wilhelm Apollinaris de Kostrowitzky, Vitam impendere amori
- Max Jacob, Le cornet a dés
- Philippe Soupault, Aquarium
- Paul Valéry, La Jeune Parque

=== Indian subcontinent ===
Including all of the British colonies that later became India, Pakistan, Bangladesh, Sri Lanka and Nepal. Listed alphabetically by first name, regardless of surname:

- Balawantrai Thakore, Bhanakar, Gujarati language
- Ci. Subrahamaniya Bharati, Kannan Pattu, Tamil language
- C. R. Sahasrabuddha, Kakaduta, a parody (a book with the same name by a different author was published in 1940), Sanskrit language
- Daulat Ram, Raja Gopi Cand, long narrative poem in the traditional genre of "Kissa", about the legend of Raja Gopi Chand, Punjabi language
- Duvvuri Rami Reddi, Nalajaramma agnipravesamu, Telugu language
- Hiteshwar Bar Barua, Desdimona Kavya, narrative poem inspired by Shakespeare's ' 'Othello' ', Assamese language
- Hiteshwar Barua, Angila, Assamese language
- Vallathol Narayana Menon, also known simply as "Vallathol", Sahityamanjari, Part I, Malayalam language

=== Other ===
- Artur Adson, Henge palango, Estonia
- Gottfried Benn, Fleisch, Germany
- António Botto, Trovas, Portugal
- Albert Ehrenstein, Die rote Zeit, Germany
- Walter Flex, Im Felde zwischen Nacht und Tag, Germany
- Stefan George, Der Krieg ("The War"); German
- Ulric-L. Gingras, La chanson du paysans; French language;, Canada
- Juan Ramón Jiménez, Diario de un poeta recién casado ("Diary of a Newly Married Poet"; later retitled Diario de poeta y mar ["Diary of Poet and Sea"), Spain
- Antonio Machado, Campos de Castilla ("Fields of Castile"), enlarged edition (first edition 1912); Spain
- Julio Molina Núñez and Juan Agustín Araya. Selva lírica, preparada, anthology, including work by Gabriela Mistral; Chile
- Giuseppe Ungaretti, Il porto sepolto ("The Buried Port"), Italy
- Henrik Visnapuu, Amores, Estonia

== Births ==
Death years link to the corresponding "[year] in poetry" article:

- March 1
  - Robert Lowell (died 1977), American poet
  - Fadwa Tuqan (died 2003), Palestinian poet
- March 17 – Takis Sinopoulos (died 1981), Greek poet
- April 9 – Johannes Bobrowski (died 1965), German lyric poet, fiction writer, adaptor and essayist
- June 7 – Gwendolyn Brooks (died 2000), African American poet
- June 30 – Judson Crews (died 2010), American poet
- July 5 – Stella Sierra (died 1997), Panamanian poet
- July 15 – Robert Conquest (died 2015), English-born historian and poet
- August 9 – Jao Tsung-I (died 2018), Chinese scholar, poet, translator, calligrapher and painter
- October 12 – James McAuley (died 1976), Australian poet
- December 9 – James Jesus Angleton (died 1987), American counterintelligence agent and poet
- December 14 – Tove Ditlevsen (suicide 1976), Danish poet and fiction writer
- December 30 – Yun Dong-ju (died 1945), Korean poet (surname: Yoon; also spelled "Yoon Dong-joo" and "Yun Tong-ju")
- Also:
  - Rainer Brambach (died 1983), German poet
  - Abdus Sattar Ranjoor Kashmiri (died 1990), Indian, Kashmiri-language poet
  - Kamakshi Prasad Chattopadhyay (died 1976), Indian, Bengali-language poet and fiction writer
  - P. N. Pushp (died 1998), Indian, Kashmiri-language scholar and poet
  - Mario Augusto Rodriguez Velez (died 2009), Panamanian journalist, essayist, dramatist, poet and storyteller (surname: Rodriguez Velez)
  - Sampath, pen name of Raghavacharya Sankhavaram, Indian, Telugu poet
  - Themis, Indian poet of the Aurobindoean School

== Deaths ==
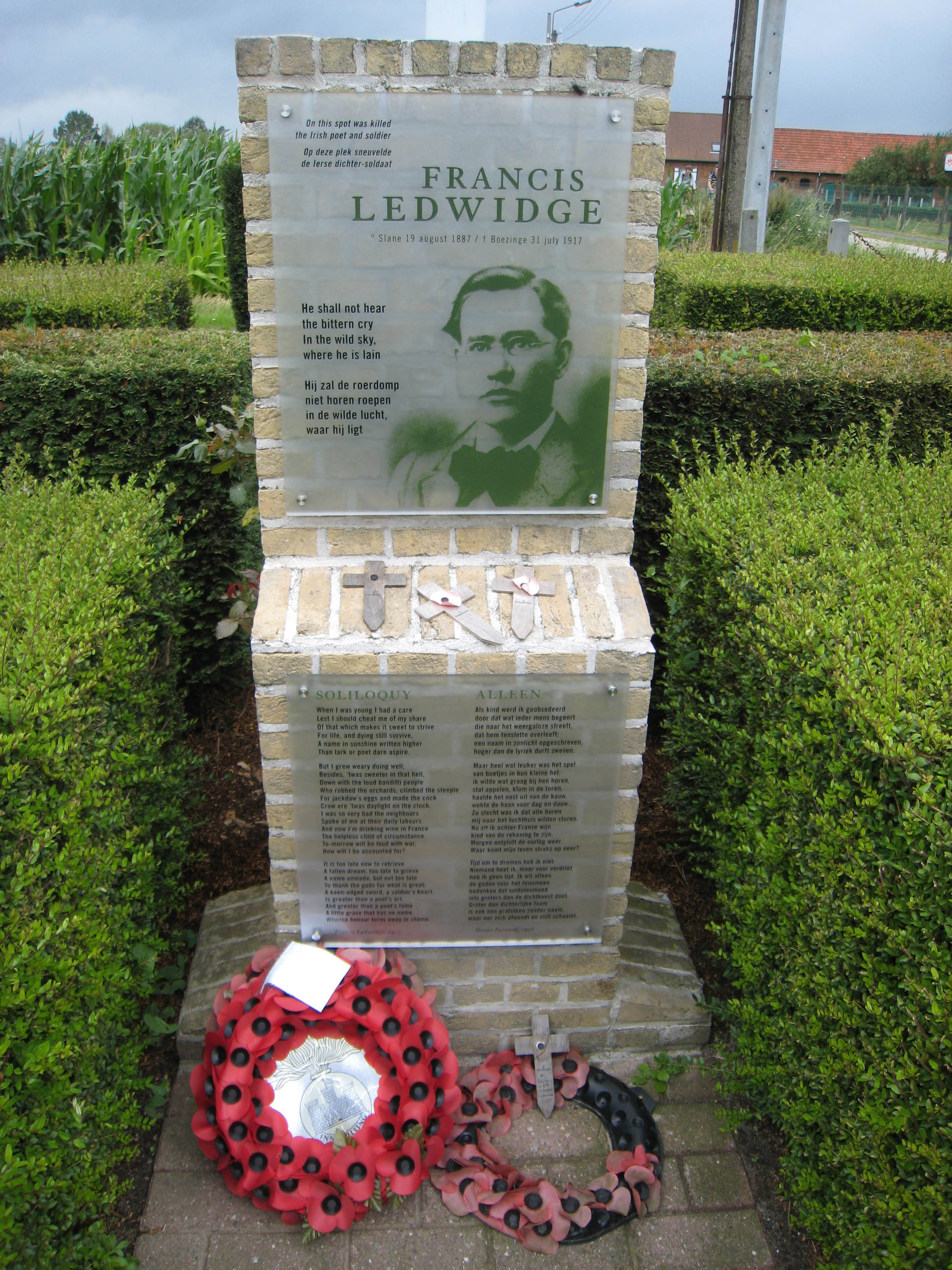
Memorial to Francis Ledwidge on the spot where he died

Birth years link to the corresponding "[year] in poetry" article:

- January 30 – Marion Juliet Mitchell, 80 (born 1836), American poet and educator
- April 7 – Susan Archer Weiss, 95 (born 1822), American poet
- April 20? – Jane Barlow, 60 (born 1857), Irish poet and novelist
- May 25 – Maksim Bahdanovič, 25 (born 1891), Belarusian poet, journalist and literary critic, of tuberculosis
- May 29 – Kate Harrington, 85 (born 1831), American teacher, writer and poet
- November 1 – Ismail Merathi (born 1844), Indian
- Also: Madhavanuj, pen name of Kashinath Hari Modak (born 1871), Indian, Marathi-language poet and translator and physician

=== Killed in World War I ===
- April 3 – Arthur Graeme West, English war poet and prose writer, shot by a sniper near Bapaume (born 1891)
- April 9
  - Edward Thomas, British poet and prose writer, killed in action during the Battle of Arras, soon after his arrival in France (born 1878)
  - R. E. Vernède, English war poet, died after being wounded by machine gun fire while leading an advance at Havrincourt (born 1875)
- July 31 – both killed in the Battle of Passchendaele near Ypres, Belgium
  - Francis Ledwidge, Irish war poet, "poet of the blackbirds" (born 1887)
  - Hedd Wyn, Welsh-language poet, killed while serving with 15th Battalion, Royal Welch Fusiliers at Pilckem Ridge (born 1887)
- September 17 – Arthur Sidgwick, English poet and essayist, died of wounds from aerial bomb near Ypres (born 1882)
- September 28 – T. E. Hulme, influential English poetry critic, killed by a shell at Oostduinkerke in Flanders Fields (born 1883)
- October 16 – Walter Flex, German war writer, died of wounds in Estonia (born 1887)
- November 23 – Ewart Alan Mackintosh, Scottish war poet, killed in the Battle of Cambrai (born 1893)

== Awards and honors ==
- Nobel Prize for Literature: Karl Adolph Gjellerup, a Danish poet and novelist, shares the award with fellow Dane Henrik Pontoppidan

== See also ==
- List of years in poetry
- Dada
- Imagism
- Modernist poetry in English
- Silver Age of Russian Poetry
- Ego-Futurism movement in Russian poetry
- Expressionism movement in German poetry
- Young Poland (Polish: Młoda Polska) modernist period in Polish arts and literature
- Poetry
