= 1891 in poetry =

This article covers 1891 in poetry. Nationality words link to articles with information on the nation's poetry or literature (for instance, Irish or France).

== Events ==
- 1891–1893 –The Rhymers Club gathers at the Cheshire Cheese in Fleet Street, London, including John Davidson, Ernest Dowson, W. B. Yeats, and others.
- c. Late June – In a meeting of decadent poets in London, Oscar Wilde is first introduced to Lord Alfred Douglas by Lionel Johnson at Wilde's Tite Street home.
- Approximate date – Edmund Clerihew Bentley, G. K. Chesterton and fellow pupils of St Paul's School, London, compose the first pseudo-biographical comic verses which become known as clerihews.

== Works published in English ==
=== Canada ===
- John Frederic Herbin, Canada, and Other Poems, Canada
- Seranus, Pine, Rose and Fleur De Lis, (Toronto: Hart).

=== United Kingdom ===
- Sir Edwin Arnold, The Light of the World; or, The Great Consummation
- Alfred Austin, Lyrical Poems
- John Davidson, In a Music Hall, and Other Poems
- James Joyce, Et tu, Healy, Irish poet published in Ireland
- Arthur Clark Kennedy, Pictures in rhyme
- William McGonagall, Poetic Gems (second series)
- William Morris, Poems by the Way
- May Sinclair, Essays in Verse
- James Kenneth Stephen:
  - Lapsus Calami
  - Quo Musa Tendis
- Katharine Tynan, Ballads and Lyrics

=== United States ===
- Thomas Bailey Aldrich, The Sisters' Tragedy
- Nathaniel Ames, The Essays, Humor, and Poems of Nathaniel Ames, published posthumously
- Emily Dickinson, Poems: Second Series
- Oliver Wendell Holmes, Over the Teacups, fiction, nonfiction and poetry
- Herman Melville, Timoleon
- Harriet Monroe, Valeria and Other Poems
- Frank Norris, Yvernelle: A Tale of Feudal France
- Lucy Creemer Peckham, Sea Moss
- Lizette Woodworth Reese, A Handful of Lavender

=== Other in English ===
- Henry Lawson, Australia:
  - "Freedom on the Wallaby"
  - "The Babies of Walloon"

== Works published in other languages ==
- Stefan George, Pilgerfahrten, limited private edition; German
- Francis Jammes, Six Sonnets, France
- Màiri Mhòr nan Òran (Mary MacPherson), Gaelic Songs and Poems, Scottish Gaelic published in the United Kingdom
- Guido Mazzoni, Poesie, Italy

== Births ==
Death years link to the corresponding "[year] in poetry" article:

- January 15 – Osip Mandelstam (died 1938), Russian poet and essayist, one of the foremost members of the Acmeist school
- April 9 – Lesbia Harford (died 1927), Australian
- May 15 – David Vogel (killed in concentration camp, 1944), Russian-born Hebrew poet
- May 21 – John Peale Bishop (died 1944), American poet and writer
- May 22
  - Johannes R. Becher (died 1958), German poet, novelist and politician
  - Edwin Gerard (died 1965), Australian poet
- July 5 – Tin Ujević (died 1955), Croatian poet
- August 19 – Francis Ledwidge (killed in action in World War I, 1917), Irish poet
- August 25 – David Shimoni (died 1956), Israeli poet and writer
- September 23 – Arthur Graeme West (killed in action in World War I, 1917), English military writer and poet
- November 14 – Josef Magnus Wehner (died 1973), German poet and playwright
- November 23 – Masao Kume 久米正雄 writing under the pen-name Santei (died 1952), Japanese, late Taishō period and early Shōwa period playwright, novelist and haiku poet (surname: Kume)
- December 9 – Maksim Bahdanovič (died 1917), Belarusian poet, journalist and literary critic
- December 10 – Nelly Sachs (died 1970), German-Swedish poet and dramatist, winner of the Nobel Prize for Literature in 1966
- Also – Peter Hopegood, born Cedric Hopegood (died 1967), English-born Australian poet

== Deaths ==
Birth years link to the corresponding "[year] in poetry" article:

- July 24 – Douglas Smith Huyghue (born 1816), Canadian and Australian poet, fiction writer, essayist and artist
- August 12 – James Russell Lowell, 72, American Romantic poet, critic, satirist, writer, diplomat, and abolitionist
- August 14 – John Henry Hopkins Jr. (born 1820), American clergyman and hymnist
- August 22 – Jan Neruda (born 1834), Czech writer
- September 28 – Herman Melville, 82, American novelist, essayist and poet
- November 10 – Arthur Rimbaud, 37 (born 1854) French poet
- Also:
  - Venmani Acchen Nambudiri (born 1817), Indian, Malayalam-language poet associated with the Venmani School of poetry
  - Moyinkutty Vaidyar (born 1857), Indian, Malayalam-language poet

== See also ==
- 19th century in poetry
- 19th century in literature
- List of years in poetry
- List of years in literature
- Victorian literature
- French literature of the 19th century
- Symbolist poetry
- Young Poland (Polish: Młoda Polska) a modernist period in Polish arts and literature, roughly from 1890 to 1918
- Poetry
