= 1917 in Australian literature =

This article presents a list of the historical events and publications of Australian literature during 1917.

== Books ==
- Randolph Bedford – The Silver Star
- Capel Boake – Painted Clay
- Mary Grant Bruce – Possum
- G. B. Lancaster – Fool Divine
- Henry Handel Richardson – Australia Felix
- Ethel Turner – Captain Cub

== Short stories ==
- Vance Palmer – "Tobacco"
- A. B. Paterson – Three Elephant Power and Other Stories

== Poetry ==
- Zora Cross – Songs of Love and Life
- C. J. Dennis
  - Doreen
  - The Glugs of Gosh
- Leon Gellert
  - "A Night Attack"
  - Songs of a Campaign
- Mary Gilmore
  - "The Ancient" (aka "Old Botany Bay")
  - "The Kiss"
  - "The Mother"
- Lesbia Harford – "I'm Like All Lovers"
- Henry Lawson – "Scots of the Riverina"
- Furnley Maurice – "1916"
- A. B. Paterson – Saltbush Bill, J.P., and Other Verses

== Births ==
A list, ordered by date of birth (and, if the date is either unspecified or repeated, ordered alphabetically by surname) of births in 1917 of Australian literary figures, authors of written works or literature-related individuals follows, including year of death.

- 11 March
  - Nancy Cato, novelist and poet (died 2000)
  - Jack Davis, playwright, poet and Indigenous rights campaigner (died 2000)
- 21 March – Frank Hardy, novelist (died 1994)
- 25 March – Barbara Jefferis, novelist and dramatist (died 2004)
- 9 May – Helen Palmer, socialist publisher (died 1979)
- 24 August – Ruth Park, novelist (born in Auckland, New Zealand) (died 2010)
- 28 August – Wilbur G. Howcroft, poet and writer for children (died 2004)
- 12 October – James McAuley, poet (died 1976)
- 17 October – Sumner Locke Elliott, novelist and dramatist (died 1991)
- 20 October – D'Arcy Niland, novelist (died 1967)
- 3 November – J. E. Macdonnell, novelist (died 2002)
- 22 November – Jon Cleary, novelist (died 2010)

== Deaths ==
A list, ordered by date of death (and, if the date is either unspecified or repeated, ordered alphabetically by surname) of deaths in 1917 of Australian literary figures, authors of written works or literature-related individuals follows, including year of birth.

- 18 October – Sumner Locke, novelist (born 1881)

== See also ==
- 1917 in Australia
- 1917 in literature
- 1917 in poetry
- List of years in Australian literature
- List of years in literature
