= May Clarke =

May or Mae Clark(e) may refer to:

- May Clark (1885–1971), English silent film actress
- Mae Clarke (1897–1982), American film and TV actress

== See also ==
- May Herschel-Clarke (1850–1950), English poet
- Clarke (surname)
