= Huyghue =

Huyghue is a surname. Notable people with the surname include:

- Douglas Smith Huyghue (1816–1891), Canadian and Australian poet, fiction writer, essayist, and artist
- Michael Huyghue (born 1961), lawyer and American football executive
