= Spanish and Latin American nursery rhymes =

Poetry for children in the Spanish language

Nursery rhymes (Spanish: rimas infantiles) in the Spanish language have been passed down by oral tradition. They may be classified according to their amusing, educative or soothing qualities.

== History and context ==
Nursery rhymes are short songs written for small children. The lyrics are usually simple and repetitive for easy comprehension and memorization. Although they are meant to be lighthearted and fun, they also function as an introduction to music and certain basic concepts learned through repetition and song.

Traditionally, nursery rhymes are taught through oral tradition where knowledge, stories, and songs are learned through generational repetition as part of familial or popular culture. In more recent decades, specialized artists have worked within the infant market.

Nursery rhymes are activities through which children can learn and play with different melodies. They also introduce children to popular themes that help with early socialization.

Many Latin American nursery rhymes are based in the context of the farm or rural life. After the Spanish conquest of the continent, much of the oral tradition derived from religious and superstitious traditions with the goal of introducing children to formative social concepts.

== Classification by function ==
One possible method of nursery rhyme classification is that of function. Although it is possible that one song may fall under more than one category, each has a different goal or purpose:

- Play songs or De Juego
- Lullabies or Nanas/Canciones de cuna
- Tongue-twisters or De habilidad
- Teaching songs or Didácticas

=== Examples ===
Los Pollitos Dicen ("Little Chickens") is a classic Spanish Nursery Rhyme De juego, and also falls under the Nana or Cancion de cuna category. Many Spanish speaking countries lay claim to this song such as Ecuador and Spain, but its author is the Chilean musician and poet Ismael Parraguez. Its popularity is similar to that of "Twinkle Twinkle Little Star" in English.

Los pollitos dicen
pío, pío, pío

cuando tienen hambre
cuando tienen frio.

La gallina busca el maiz
y el trigo

les da la comida y les
presta abrigo.

Bajo de sus alas,
acurrucaditos

duermen los pollitos hasta
el otro día!''

Little chickies squeal,
cheep cheep cheep,

When they are so cold, and when
they want a meal.

Mama goes and gets them corn
from the field,

serves them each their food, and
warms them head to heel.

Chickies sleep so yummy,
snuggled up with mommy,

And that’s just where they’ll stay
until another day.
