= Esmond Venner Keogh =

Australian military doctor (1895–1970)

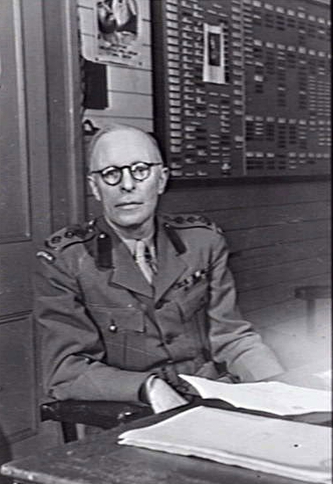
- Born: 21 November 1895; Malvern, Victoria, Australia
- Died: 30 September 1970 (aged 74); Parkville, Victoria, Australia
- Relatives: Lesbia Harford (sister)
- Military career
- Allegiance: Australia
- Branch: Australian Army
- Service years: 1914–1919, 1939–1946
- Rank: Colonel
- Nickname: Bill
- Service number: VX230
- Commands: Director of Hygiene, Pathology and Entomology at Allied Land Forces Headquarters
- Conflicts: First World War; Gallipoli Campaign; Battle of Sari Bair; Battle of Hill 60; Western Front; Battle of Messines; Battle of Broodseinde; Battle of Passchendaele; Battle of Amiens; Battle of Mont St Quentin; Second World War; North African campaign; New Guinea campaign
- Awards: Distinguished Conduct Medal; Military Medal

Colonel Esmond Venner (Bill) Keogh, DCM, MM, FRACP (21 November 1895 – 30 September 1970) was an Australian physician, medical scientist, and army officer who was instrumental in saving thousands of lives from tuberculosis, polio, cancer and other diseases.

Keogh entered the University of Melbourne in 1914, but did not complete his course, as he enlisted in the First Australian Imperial Force (AIF) after the outbreak of the First World War, and fought in the Gallipoli Campaign with the 3rd Light Horse Field Ambulance. In 1916 he transferred to the 9th Machine Gun Company, and fought on the Western Front, where he was wounded, and was awarded the Military Medal and Distinguished Conduct Medal for gallantry.

In 1922 Keogh returned to the University of Melbourne. He qualified as a doctor and joined the Commonwealth Serum Laboratories as a medical officer. In 1939 he joined the Second Australian Imperial Force and served in the Middle East as a pathologist. He became the Assistant Director of Pathology at Allied Land Forces headquarters in Australia in 1942 and the Director of Hygiene, Entomology and Pathology in 1944. In these roles he directed the Australian Army's struggle against dysentery, typhoid and malaria, and he oversaw the production of penicillin in Australia. After the war he directed public health campaigns against tuberculosis, polio and cancer.

== Early life ==
Esmond Venner Keogh was born in the Melbourne suburb of Malvern on 21 November 1895, the son of Esmond Joseph Keogh, an estate agent, and his wife Helen Beatrice née Moore, a nurse. He had two older sisters, Lesbia and Estelle, and a younger brother, Gerard Basil (Gerry). His father's estate agency business failed and his parents separated around 1900. His father moved to Western Australia, where he became a labourer with the Public Works Department; his mother was engaged to care for four young children whose parents, friends of hers, had been killed in an accident. For a time, Esmond and his brother Gerry lived in South Yarra with their father's brother, Eustace Keogh, a medical doctor. His mother inherited £2,000 (equivalent to $704,000 in 2022) from her father-in-law Edmund Keogh's estate and used the money to buy a property and open a hostel for nurses, which evolved into a nurses' employment agency.

Keogh attended a parish school, and then, in 1906, he became a boarder at Padua College on the Mornington Peninsula. In 1908 he went to St Stanislaus' College in Bathurst, New South Wales. The following year he won a scholarship to the exclusive Melbourne Grammar. That the family was Catholic and the Melbourne Grammar was affiliated with the Church of England was not overlooked, but his mother had converted only before marriage and she put a high value on her children receiving the best possible education. He commenced there in 1911, and the next year he won a half-scholarship for his final year, along with Wilfrid Kent Hughes.

In December 1913, Keogh won a scholarship to attend Trinity College, Melbourne, one of the residential colleges of the University of Melbourne. He studied agricultural science and, under the influence of his sister Lesbia, attended Unitarian services conducted by Frederick Sinclaire and meetings of the Victorian Socialist Party. He was not a pacifist, and served with the compulsory Australian Army Cadets.

== First World War ==
=== Gallipoli campaign ===
On 13 November 1914, not long after the outbreak of the First World War, Keogh enlisted in the First Australian Imperial Force (AIF). As he was underage, he needed a signed letter of permission from his mother. He gave his religion as "unitarian". He joined the 3rd Light Horse Field Ambulance, the medical unit supporting the 3rd Light Horse Brigade, under the command of Lieutenant Colonel Rupert Downes, at Broadmeadows Army Camp. On 2 February 1915, the 3rd Light Horse Field Ambulance embarked for Egypt on the troop transport HMAT Chilka. The unit established a hospital at Heliopolis, where they treated incoming wounded from landing at Cape Helles. In May it was decided to send the light horse to fight in the Gallipoli campaign. The 3rd Light Horse Field Ambulance embarked on the troop transport HMT Menominee on 17 May. It arrived in Lemnos on 21 May and then transferred to the destroyer HMS Wolverine. which took them to Anzac Cove.

The 3rd Light Horse Field Ambulance remained at Anzac until 26 June 1915, when it returned to Mudros to conserve drinking water. It helped establish a hospital there for 200 patients. It returned to Anzac on 3 August to participate in the Battle of Sari Bair. Medical arrangements for the battle were deplorable. Stretcher bearers delivered wounded to the casualty clearing stations at the beach, a distance of about 1 mile (1.6 km) but over mountainous terrain and under shrapnel fire. When they got there, they were not given replacement stretchers, and were sent back without them. Thereafter, many of the wounded had to be carried back on the backs of the stretcher bearers. The 3rd Field Ambulance was called upon again for the Battle of Hill 60 on 21 August. Once again, medical arrangements were deficient

Keogh was admitted to hospital at Fisherman's Hut at Anzac on 26 September 1915 and was discharged on 2 October. By mid-October battle casualties and disease had reduced the number of the 3rd Light Horse Field Ambulance's stretcher bearers from thirty-two to seven. Keogh returned to Mudros on 10 November as part of the first stage of the evacuation of Gallipoli. From there, the 3rd Field Ambulance returned to Alexandria on the SS Caledonia on 24 December.

=== Western Front ===
Back in Egypt, the 3rd Field Ambulance was stationed at the hospital at Heliopolis. Keogh was reunited with his sister Estelle, who had joined Queen Alexandra's Imperial Military Nursing Service. Keogh's father and brother Gerry enlisted in the AIF the following year; the exception was his sister Lesbia, who protested against the war as a member of the Industrial Workers of the World. On 7 April 1916, Keogh embarked for Australia again on the troop transport HMAT Runic, ostensibly to complete his medical degree. He adopted a new nickname. Henceforth family members and old friends would still call him "Es" but to everyone else he was known as "Bill".

In Australia he put in for a transfer to a combat unit, and was assigned to the 9th Machine Gun Company, part of the 3rd Division, which was being formed in Australia. He embarked from Melbourne on the RMS Orontes on 16 August 1916, and arrived in the UK on 2 October 1916. He went to France on 2 November 1916, and went into the line on the Western Front. He was transferred to the 9th Field Ambulance, but rejoined the 9th Machine Gun Company on 7 June 1917 and participated in the Battle of Messines in June and the Battle of Broodseinde in October.

He was promoted to the temporary rank of corporal on 7 October 1917, but relinquished the rank after being shot in the right hand in the Battle of Passchendaele five days later. He was evacuated to England on the hospital ship Jan Breyel and admitted to the 2/1st Southern General Hospital in Birmingham on 17 October. He was discharged on 15 November, and assigned to the 3rd Command Depot at Hurdcott. He joined the Overseas Training Brigade at Grantham on 24 November, and then the Machine Gun Training Brigade at Longbridge Deverill on 8 December. He was awarded the Military Medal, which was gazetted on 25 January 1918.

Keogh embarked for France on 26 April 1918 and rejoined the 9th Machine Gun Company on 9 May. He was promoted to temporary sergeant on 13 May, which became permanent on 24 July. He participated in the Battle of Amiens in August and the Battle of Mont St Quentin in September. He was awarded the Distinguished Conduct Medal for an action with the 41st Battalion. His citation read:

For conspicuous gallantry and devotion to duty. On the 29th September 1918 near Quennemont Farm, he took charge of a section whose officer had become a casualty, and moved the section forward with a battalion and got them into action under heavy artillery and machine gun fire, engaging parties of the enemy and preventing them bringing light machine guns into action against our infantry. Throughout he displayed great skill and leadership.

On 22 February 1919 he was admitted to the 1st Australian General Hospital with Spanish flu. He was discharged on 28 February, and embarked for Australia on the troop ship HMAT Port Denison on 25 March. He arrived back in Melbourne on 10 May, where his AIF appointment was terminated on 9 July.

== Between the wars ==
After the war, Keogh decided to become a farmer. He applied for a farm under the Soldier Settlement Scheme in 1919, but was unsuccessful. His father had better luck, and was granted a small 130-acre (53 ha) dairy farm with fifteen cows in East Gippsland. He moved in in November 1920, and Keogh stayed with him for the first year, working as a farm hand in the hope of qualifying for a land grant himself, but in 1921 his application was again declined, as was his father's proposal in June 1921 that the farm be subdivided to give him a plot.

Frustrated in his ambition to become a farmer, Keogh returned to the University of Melbourne in 1922 to study medicine. It was three years before he achieved a pass for the full year in his end-of-year exams; in his first year he passed zoology and in his second year passed physiology only after a supplemental examination. In his third year he only managed to pass his anatomy exam because Clifford Henry Searby, a member of the medical faculty that he had met while serving in Egypt, intervened on his behalf. Thereafter, Keogh's marks gradually improved. In his fourth year he started clinical training at The Alfred Hospital and he earned an honour in bacteriology. But in his final year examinations in 1927, he gained first-class honours in medicine, second-class in surgery and third-class in obstetrics and gynaecology. He was awarded the degrees of Bachelor of Medicine and Bachelor of Surgery on 19 September 1927.

For his residency, Keogh was accepted by The Alfred Hospital. But clinical medicine was not to his taste; he preferred the work of a researcher. His friend Ian Jeffreys Wood's father, Alan Jeffreys Wood was a paediatrician at the Royal Children's Hospital, and he wrote to John Cumpston, the Director-General of the Commonwealth Department of Health on Keogh's behalf. On 17 May 1928, Keogh was gazetted as a medical officer in the Department of Health, and he began working at the Commonwealth Serum Laboratories (CSL) in Parkville, Victoria.

Training was haphazard; new medical officers would do short tours of duty to relieve the regular medical officers at outstations. Keogh was sent to Kalgoorlie, Rockhampton, Lismore, Port Pirie, Launceston and Bendigo, returning to Parkville between assignments. In Bendigo, he helped deal with an outbreak of tuberculosis. In Port Pirie, he investigated a reported case of anthrax. After returning for Bendigo in 1935, he established an independent research unit at CSL. Working in collaboration with Macfarlane Burnet and Dora Lush at the Walter and Eliza Hall Institute, he mastered the technique of growing viruses in the membrane of a fertilised egg, and he published eighteen papers between 1936 and 1941.

Keogh's main interest was horse racing, and a highlight of the decade was backing Wotan to win the 1936 Melbourne Cup at odds of 100-1. He liked Post-Impressionism; he attended meetings of the Contemporary Art Society if he was in Melbourne, and he purchased artworks by Danila Vassilieff and Yosl Bergner for his own collection. Partly this was to support struggling artists, but he genuinely admired their work, and he proudly displayed them in his home.

== Second World War ==
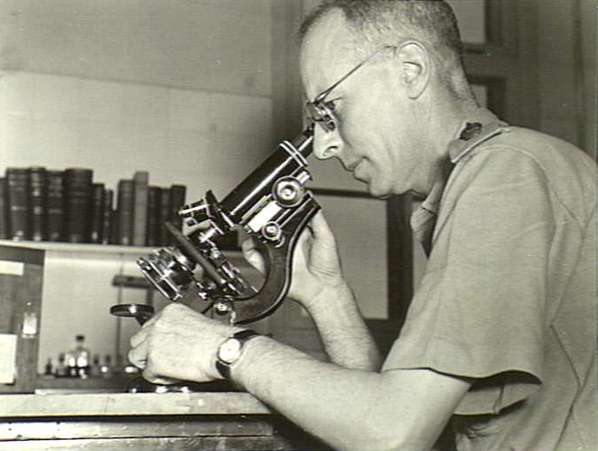
Keogh in the pathological department of the 2/2nd Australian General Hospital in Gaza

=== Middle East ===
On 6 July 1939, Keogh and his friend Stanley Williams from the Royal Children's Hospital left for the United States to attend medical conferences in New York and San Francisco. In New York he met up with his old friend Dorothy Blanchard, who was now married to Oscar Hammerstein II, an American theatrical producer, whose production The Philadelphia Story was running on Broadway, and Keogh became friends with its star, Katharine Hepburn. He also met the author John Steinbeck, whom he later entertained in Australia. Their trip was interrupted by the outbreak of the Second World War on 3 September. They took the train to Vancouver and returned to Australia on the RMS Niagara.

Keogh was seconded to the Second Australian Imperial Force from the Citizen Military Forces with the rank of major on 13 October 1939, and was allocated the AIF service number VX230. He joined the 2/2nd General Hospital on 2 February 1940. He embarked from Melbourne on the RMS Strathaird, which had been taken up at a troop ship. Fellow medical officers on board included Captain Richard Roderick Andrew, Majors Ian Jeffreys Wood, Julian Ormond Smith and Major Edgar Samuel John King, Lieutenant Colonel Edmund Britten Jones, and Colonel William Wallace Stewart Johnston; other officers included Lieutenant Eugene Gorman, Captain Charles Spry and Brigadier Edmund Herring. The ship reached Kantara on 17 May, and the 2/2nd General Hospital opened there. In addition to his routine duties with the hospital, Keogh was appointed an advisor on pathology to the medical staff of the I Corps.

An early problem that confronted the AIF's medical system was the prevalence of dysentery. Keogh, Andrew and Ray Hone determined that 78 per cent of cases were of the Flexner type, which they found could be treated with sulfanilamide. They published their results in the Medical Journal of Australia in June 1942.

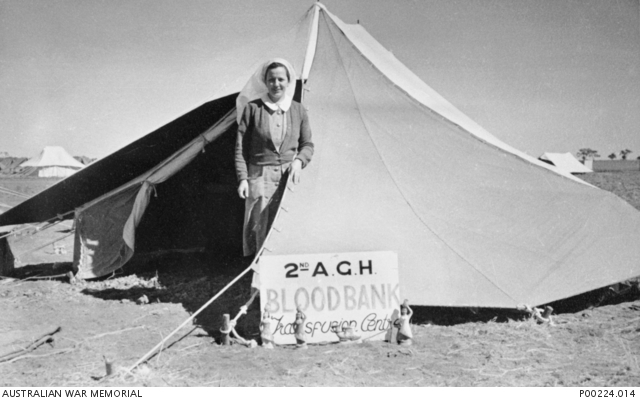
Sister Bobbie Roberts of the 2/2nd Australian General Hospital outside the blood bank

The availability of serum for blood transfusions was another issue examined. While in the United States Keogh and Williams had seen dried serum. Efforts were made to prepare it in Australia, but the problem then arose of how to reconstitute it, which required sterile, distilled water, something not so easy to obtain in the field. Keogh speculated that serum could be kept at room temperature. CSL supplied a quantity for testing, and Williams brought it from Australia in his personal baggage. It was found that serum could be transported and stored at room temperature in sealed containers for up to a year. Keogh trained a skilled transfusion staff under Sister Ellen Margaret (Bobbie) Roberts.

In January 1941 the British Army began planning operations in Greece. Colonel Neil Hamilton Fairley and his British colleague, Colonel John Boyd, the consulting pathologist, drafted a medical appreciation that warned of the danger of very heavy casualties from malaria. The British Commander-in-Chief, General Sir Archibald Wavell decried their report as "typical of a very non-medical and non-military spirit". A face-to-face meeting held with Boyd and Fairley supported by Keogh, Brigadier Roy Burston and Major Edward Ford, convinced Wavell that they were serious. Wavell altered his campaign plan to position allied forces further south, away from the areas where malaria was hyperendemic.

Another concern was typhoid. During the First World War the incidence of this disease had been kept down through the introduction of a combined typhoid vaccine and vaccine for paratyphoid fever types A and B, known as the TAB vaccine. When the Second AIF was formed, vaccination was made compulsory. In 1940 there were 0.49 cases per 1,000 personnel in the AIF but in 1941 the incidence rose to 1.05 per thousand, which was much higher than among British troops in the Middle East. Although the numbers were low, the disease had a high fatality rate. Boyd conducted some tests with mice, and determined that the Australian vaccine produced by CSL did not have the same amount of the Vi antigen and therefore was not as effective as it British counterpart. A more virulent strain was sent to Australia to improve the vaccine being produced there. In the meantime, Keogh had all members of the AIF in the Middle East given a booster shot of the British vaccine.

=== South West Pacific ===
The 2/2nd General Hospital embarked for Australia on the RMS Strathallan on 17 February 1942, disembarking in Adelaide on 17 March. In General Sir Thomas Blamey's reorganisation of the Australian Army, Keogh joined the staff of the Director of Medical Services at Allied Land Forces headquarters (LHQ) on 11 May as the Assistant Director of Pathology. He was promoted to the temporary rank of lieutenant colonel on 13 November 1942, and temporary colonel on 13 November 1943, and became the Director of Hygiene, Entomology and Pathology on 23 March 1944. Although he was located at the Victoria Barracks in Melbourne, he spent much of his time further north. He frequently visited Sydney, where he established an Army School of Tropical Medicine there. He also visited New Guinea from 26 February to 9 March 1945.

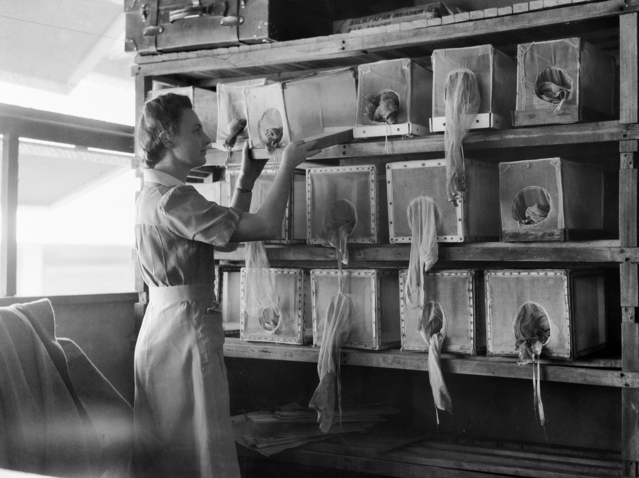
Malaria research at the Medical Research Unit in Cairns

The Australian Army's biggest problem was malaria. Despite the experience with malaria in the Middle East, most of the troops had a poor understanding of anti-malaria precautions and few medical officers had encountered the disease. In combination with critical shortages of drugs and anti-malarial supplies such as netting, insecticides and repellents, the result was a medical disaster. In the 13-week period from 31 October 1942 to 1 January 1943, the Army reported 4,137 battle casualties, but 14,011 casualties from tropical diseases, of which 12,240 were from malaria. The government grimly contemplated disbanding divisions to replace malaria casualties. "Our worst enemy in New Guinea," Blamey declared, "is not the Nip—it’s the bite."

Fairley drew up a comprehensive strategy to combat malaria; its implementation was Keogh's responsibility. The LHQ Medical Research Unit was established in Cairns under the command of Andrew and later Lieutenant Colonel Ruthven Blackburn. It used human test subjects, all volunteers drawn from the Australian Army, including a small but notable group of "Dunera Boys" (Jewish refugees) from the 8th Employment Company. The volunteers were infected with strains of malaria from infected mosquitoes, or from the blood of other test subjects, which was then treated with various drugs. The volunteers were rewarded with three weeks' leave and a certificate of appreciation signed by Blamey. The LHQ Medical Research Unit researched quinine, sulphonamides, atebrin, plasmoquine, and paludrine. Atebrin was found to not just suppress malaria, but to kill it. Keogh and Ford adopted an aggressive strategy, supplying the troops with atebrin and forcing them to take it. By December 1944, the incidence of malaria had fallen to 14.3 cases per 1,000.

Another initiative of Keogh's was the production of penicillin in Australia, a drug that had recently been developed by a team in the UK led by Howard Florey and was still unproven. In mid-1943 he summoned Captain Percival Bazeley, whom he had worked with on streptococci and staphlococci at CSL before the war, but who was now commanding a tank squadron of the 2/8th Armoured Regiment in New Guinea, and introduced him to Lieutenant H. H. Kretchmar, a chemist. He directed them to establish a production facility by Christmas. They set off on a fact-finding mission to the United States. They visited Peoria, Illinois, where penicillin was being developed, and obtained cultures from Robert D. Coghill. They also inspected the Pfizer plant in Brooklyn and the Merck plant at Rahway, New Jersey. The first Australian-made penicillin began reaching the troops in New Guinea in December 1943.

=== United States ===
Keogh relinquished his appointment as Director of Hygiene, Entomology and Pathology on 25 April 1945, handing over to Ford, and became the Assistant Director General of Medical Services (ADGMS) in the Australian Military Mission to the United States, based in Washington, DC. He arrived in the United States on 16 May 1945. At The Pentagon he discussed methods of improving the production of penicillin and sulpha drugs. He spoke to Joseph Edward Smadel about the use of chloramphenicol to treat typhus, with Andrew Feldman about streptomycin, and with John Franklin Enders, who was attempting to culture the polio virus, as a first step towards one day developing a vaccine.

Keogh's appointment as ADGMS was relinquished on 12 December, and he spent Christmas with his niece Dawn Bohnert in West Virginia. He sailed to England on 23 January 1946 to finalise arrangements for fellowships with the Nuffield Foundation, then emplaned for Australia on 14 February, and he ceased to be part of the Australian Military Mission to the United States. He was transferred to the Reserve of Officers on 12 April with the rank of lieutenant colonel and the honorary rank of colonel. He was granted permission to wear his uniform as an Australian observer at the Operation Crossroads nuclear tests in July 1946, but for some reason the United States authorities did not let him attend. He was officially transferred to the retired list on 2 November 1952.

== Later life ==
=== Early postwar years ===
With the war over, Keogh returned to CSL as its Deputy Director for Research. Between 1946 and 1949, he authored or co-authored five articles, three of which were published in Nature. His research interests included hemagglutinins, the study of which led to the development of a new pertussis vaccine, which was produced at CSL between 1952 and 1963. He also studied bacterial meningitis.

Keogh became a member of the Medical Research Advisory Committee of the National Health and Medical Research Council (NHMRC), which was responsible for recommending research grants. The NHMRC's funding for research was greatly increased during the early postwar years, with it rising from £46,000 in 1948 (equivalent to $6,367,000 in 2022) to £991,000 (equivalent to $70,330,000 in 2022). The war had changed the image of medical research, and the teaching hospitals began establishing clinical research units. The Royal Melbourne Hospital created one in 1946, followed by the Royal Children's Hospital in 1948 and the Alfred in 1949. Many of these units were headed by Keogh's protégés.

Funding for universities was also increased. The Chifley government also created the Australian National University (ANU). Keogh initially opposed the creation of the John Curtin School of Medical Research at the ANU, fearing that it would take funds away from existing institutions like CSL, but this proved to not be the case. Keogh was asked for advice on the creation of a microbiology department at the ANU. He suggested a collection of simple huts that could be erected quickly and cheaply and later modified. His recommendation was not adopted, but Frank Fenner, who had succeeded Keogh as the pathologist at the 2/2nd General Hospital, was chosen as the inaugural professor of microbiology.

=== Tuberculosis ===
On 21 December 1949, Charles Gartside, the Victorian minister for health announced that Keogh had been appointed to a three-year term as Director of Tuberculosis, with a salary of £3,000 (equivalent to $349,000 in 2022). This was part of an Australia-wide attack on the disease by the state and federal governments. Cases were detected by mass but not compulsory chest X-rays. Those identified with the disease were quarantined in a sanatorium. Although the federal government provided funds for more beds, the chest X-rays identified more cases, and waiting lists were not eliminated.

Keogh had weapons for the campaign that had not been available to all of his predecessors. The BCG vaccine was used on at-risk groups like children. Streptomycin had become available, but his predecessor, Bell Ferguson, had been skeptical about its efficacy and preferred the more traditional bed rest. Two new drugs became available in the early 1950s, para-aminosalicylic acid and isoniazid, which enabled patients to be cured and returned to the community more quickly. This reduced the waiting lists for beds. In 1952, Keogh confidently reported that notifications had reached their peak, and in 1955 he was able to release 250 beds. Keogh resigned in 1955, confident that campaign was working. Indeed it was: cases declined from 1,057 in 1954 to 274 in 1977.

=== Polio ===
Keogh and Burnet had studied polio before the war. Now they teamed up again. A breakthrough had been achieved in 1950 by Jonas Salk with the development of his Salk vaccine. Salk contacted Burnet, and Burnet spoke to Keogh about the prospect of mass-producing the vaccine in Australia. The vaccine used dead polio viruses, and they were aware of the danger of an improperly prepared or tested Salk vaccine. Just such an incident did occur in the United States in 1955. In the Cutter incident, an improperly tested Salk vaccine had killed 5 vaccinated children and paralysed 51. If that was not bad enough, it also started a polio epidemic in which another 113 people were paralysed and 5 died.

For Keogh, there was only one man to lead the effort in Australia: Bazeley, who had set up penicillin production during the war. With the help of Jo Gullett, Keogh took his case directly to the Prime Minister, Robert Menzies. Once again, Bazeley was sent to the United States on a mission. Keogh arranged for Allan Ferris, a pathologist at Fairfield Infectious Diseases Hospital, to be given an NHMRC grant to join Salk and Bazeley at the University of Pittsburgh School of Medicine. On his return to Melbourne, Ferris established a virus testing laboratory at Fairfield that would play a key role in the polio campaign.

Keogh went to the United States to see Salk and Bazeley in person in 1955. Bazeley arranged for the purchase of the necessary equipment, and initiated mass production at CSL. The NHMRC set up a committee consisting of Keogh, Burnet and Fenner to supervise the campaign. Between July 1953 and July 1956, when the vaccinations commenced, there were 4,168 cases of polio in Australia. In the twelve months after July 1956 there were 62 cases. There were 278 cases between July 1958 and June 1961, and as the pool of infection shrank, the number of reported cases dropped to zero. The locally-produced Salk vaccine was replaced with the imported Sabin vaccine in 1966.

=== Cancer ===
In June 1955, Keogh wrote to Peter MacCallum, the chairman of the Anti-Cancer Council of Victoria, offering his services. His offer was accepted, and he was appointed the medical advisor and secretary to the Council the following month, with an annual salary of £1,500 (equivalent to $116,000 in 2022). The position was nominally a part-time one, but Keogh worked full time. The council was moribund when he arrived, but he effected sweeping changes. In the early 1950s there were only two paid staff; fifteen years later there were twenty, including a public relations officer. Keogh realised that fund raising campaign was required, and he found the man to run it: William Kilpatrick. He was sent to the United States to study modern fundraising techniques. Kilpatrick brought back the concept of the doorknock appeal. A 1958 fundraising drive that aimed to raise £500,000 wound up raking in £1,350,000 (equivalent to $95,144,000 in 2022).

Much of the money was used to fund cancer research. Between 1958 and 1968, the Anti-Cancer Council dispensed $1,800,000 (equivalent to $25,043,000 in 2022) in research grants. In those days cancer was surrounded by superstition and stigma. There was no cancer equivalent to the chest X-rays used to find tuberculosis, but there was a test for one cancer. Doctors at the Royal Women's Hospital and Peter MacCallum Cancer Centre asserted that pap tests could detect cervical cancer in its early stages. Keogh arranged for George Wied, an expert on cytology, to visit Victoria at the Anti-Cancer Council's expense, and he arranged for a cytology unit to be established at Prince Henry's Hospital, to which the Anti-Cancer Council contributed £25,000 (equivalent to $1,576,000 in 2022). In April 1965, 100 pap tests were conducted in Victoria each week; by June, following an education campaign, the number had risen to 1,000.

Skin cancer was another cancer that was amenable to early detection and action. Keogh co-wrote a paper on the subject, but the Anti-Cancer Council only commenced major public awareness campaigns in the 1970s. However a killer that attracted Keogh's attention was lung cancer. The connection between smoking and lung cancer had been noted and documented in the early 1950s. Keogh wrote an editorial warning against smoking in the Anti-Cancer Council's organ, Cancer News, in 1963, and an education programs aimed at children began the following year. A member of the public wrote in to Keogh saying that many shopkeepers were unaware that it was illegal to sell cigarettes to children, and that perhaps warning labels should be placed on the packets. Keogh felt that this was a good idea, and wrote to the Department of Health. It would take many years, but this would be adopted. During his time on the Anti-Cancer Council lung cancer rates doubled. He felt partly responsible, because cigarettes had been provided free to the soldiers during the war. He fought for cancer to be considered a military service-related disability. Keogh retired in May 1968.

== Personal life ==
Keogh never married. He was homosexual and had relationships with a series of partners. He was always discreet, as the medical profession was homophobic at the time. On 8 May 1970, Keogh participated in the moratorium march against Australian participation in the Vietnam War.

== Death ==
Keogh died from bowel cancer on 30 September 1970 at Royal Melbourne Hospital in Parkville. He bequeathed his body to the anatomy department of the University of Melbourne to be used for training medical students, but his bequest was not accepted. His remains were cremated and interred with those of his parents at Melbourne General Cemetery. He had requested that no obituaries be written and no memorial raised. His friends and colleagues arranged a memorial gathering at the Royal Australasian College of Surgeons building on 5 October. Sir Benjamin Keith Rank gave the memorial address. Keogh's papers are held by the archives of the Cancer Council of Victoria.
