= Estelle Venner Keogh =

Australian nurse (1892–1966)

Sister Estelle Venner Wilkins RRC
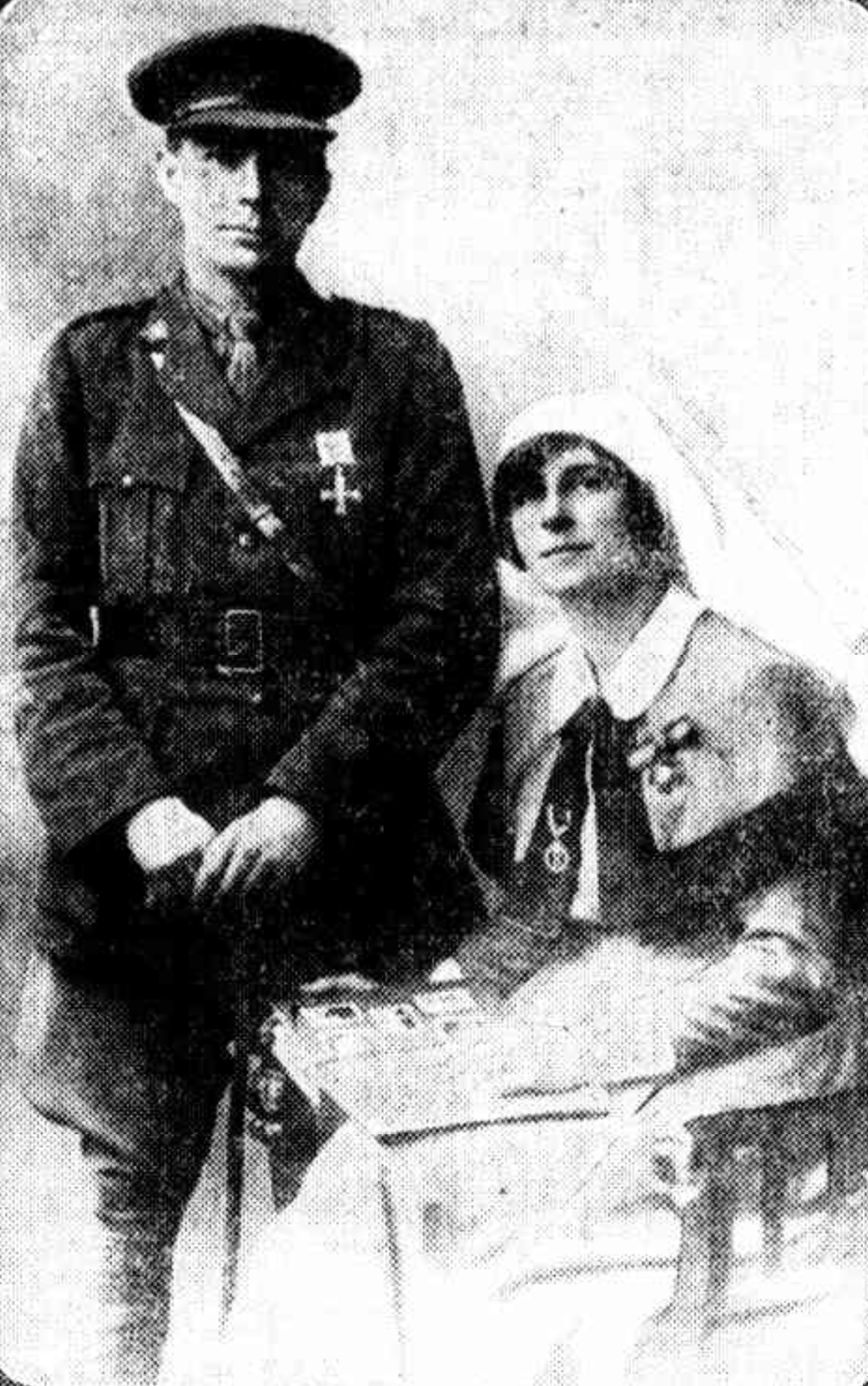
- Born: Estelle Venner Keogh; 7 July 1892; Malvern, Victoria
- Died: 3 April 1966 (aged 73); Potts Point, New South Wales
- Spouse: George Wilkins (m. 1918; died 1945)
- Relatives: Lesbia Harford (sister); Esmond Venner Keogh (brother)
- Military career
- Allegiance: United Kingdom
- Branch: Queen Alexandra's Royal Army Nursing Corps
- Service years: 1915–1918
- Rank: Sister
- Conflicts: First World War
- Awards: Royal Red Cross

Estelle Venner Wilkins, RRC (née Keogh; 7 July 1892 – 3 April 1966) was an Australian nurse who served in the Queen Alexandra's Imperial Nursing service during the First World War. She was awarded a Royal Red Cross (1st class) by the King in 1918 for her bravery evacuating patients from Ypres and Poperinghe while under fire.

== Early life ==
Keogh was born on 7 July 1892 in Malvern, Victoria. She was the second child born to Helen Beatrice Moore, and Edmund Joseph Keogh. Helen was a business woman and nurse, and was a cousin to the Marquis of Drogheda. Keogh's father Edmund was an estate agent, and camel breeder from Western Australia. Keogh's father's estate agency business failed and her parents separated around 1900. Her father moved to Western Australia, where he became a labourer. Her mother was engaged to care for four young children whose parents, friends of hers, had been killed in an accident. Her mother inherited £2,000 from her father-in-law Edmund Keogh's estate and used the money to buy a property and open a hostel for nurses, which evolved into a nurses' employment agency.

Keogh's younger brothers, Esmond Venner Keogh, and Gerard Basil Venner Keogh, also served in the First World War along with their father, who joined the Imperial Camel Corps. However, her older sister Lesbia Harford, who was a poet and a political activist who was studying law at the University of Melbourne when the war started, was actively involved in anti-war and anti-conscription agitation.

On 2 July 1914, Keogh received honorary mention at the Royal Trained Nurse Association for her nursing examination results. She trained as a nurse at the Alfred Hospital.

== Career ==
Keogh was on duty at the Glenroy Base Hospital, and was unable to attend active service because she was too young for service in the Australian forces. Instead, in December 1915, she travelled to England and enlisted in the Queen Alexandra's Royal Army Nursing Corps. Her first appointment was at a military hospital in Abbeville, France. Keogh was then appointed to working on the barges that travelled down the Somme to the casualty stations along the bank collecting wounded soldiers. The barges were set up as hospital ships with surgical equipment for emergency operations, and removable covers to protect them from the weather. They were a simple and comfortable form of transport for 30 patients at a time. Keogh worked on the barges for many weeks, until winter when the river rose too high for the barges to pass under the bridges. After this, she joined Major Gordon Taylor's surgical team, which was one of a number of small teams that would visit casualty stations to relieve service after big engagements. Each team had a doctor, a nurse, an anaesthetist and an orderly, and would often work 16 hour shifts.

One night, while Keogh was on duty at a clearing station between Ypres and Poperinghe, they came under a bombardment. From 10pm shells began falling at a rate of six to the hour. The first killed a Canadian nurse, and another caused another colleague to lose an eye. When the order was given to evacuate, Keogh took part in evacuating patients. She continued working under fire, until the last of the patients had been moved. They were evacuated to a Saint-Omer Convent, where Keogh reported effects of the shelling led to her nerves tingling in response to even ordinary noises such as the banging of a door. In recognition of the skill and bravery she displayed while evacuating the casualty clearing station, Keogh was awarded the Royal Red Cross (1st class), the highest military honour available to an army service nurse.The medal was presented to Keogh by King George V at Buckingham Palace in 1918. Afterwards, at the request of the King's mother, Queen Alexandra, Wilkins and the other nurses attended the Marlborough House, so Queen Alexandra could personally congratulate them.

In 1918 she was recommended for a Military Medal.

== Later life ==
On the journey home from the war, Keogh met Lieutenant George Henry Wilkins who had served at Gallipoli and then in France. At the time of their meeting, he was still experiencing significant symptoms from being gassed. They moved to Tasmania and married on 6 April 1918 in Launceston. Keogh and Wilkins had five children, Lloyd, Jack, Dawn, Cecily, and Fay. The family ended up settling in Potts Point, New South Wales. Keogh's husband died as a prisoner of war during the Second World War on 9 April 1945, after being taken prisoner after the fall of Singapore. Four of Keogh's children served in the Second World War.

Keogh died on 3 April 1966 in Potts Point, New South Wales, aged 73.
