= Ismael Parraguez =

Ismael Parraguez Cabezas
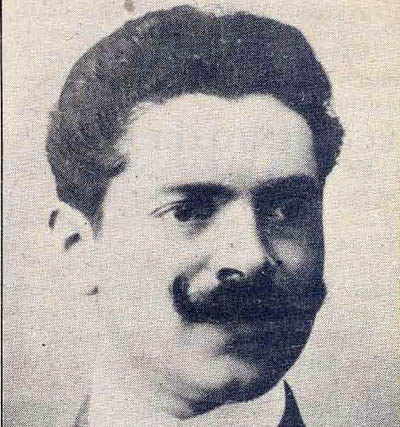
- Photograph of Ismael Parraguez, in an unknown date.
- Born: Francisco Ismael Segundo Parraguez Cabezas; 26 August 1883; Pichidegua, Chile
- Died: 8 May 1917 (aged 33); Santiago, Chile
- Education: Escuela Normal Abelardo Núñez
- Occupations: Musician, Normal teacher, poet, novelist
- Spouse: Ester Ortiz
- Children: Hernán, Flora, Julio, Waldo, Gonzalo
- Writing career
- Pen name: Misael Guerra
- Language: Spanish

Francisco Ismael Segundo Parraguez Cabezas, or simply Ismael Parraguez (1883—8 May 1917) was a Chilean musician, Normal teacher, poet, and novelist. He was known for being the creator of the Orfeón Chileno in 1914, during the centennial of the Battle of Rancagua and the children's poem Los pollitos dicen, which he published on his 1907 book Poesías Infantiles. Parraguez was also known by the pseudonym of Misael Guerra.

== Biography ==
Francisco Ismael Segundo was born on 26 August 1883, at Fundo Las Pataguas in Pichidegua, Colchagua province, in central Chile. Parraguez studied at the Escuela Normal José Abelardo Núñez in Santiago. He graduated there in 1899 as a normal teacher. According to Héctor González, a Chilean writer and journalist for the El Rancagüino newspaper, Parraguez was known for "his great way to teach how to sing to his students, for the songs he wrote, spread all over the country." He published his first book, Un idilio menos, in 1903, which soon went out of stock. It was followed by Poesías infantiles some years later, in 1907. Esperanza, his last novel, was published in 1916.

Other works by Parraguez, according to historian Antonio Saldías, include the Hymn of the Liceo de Aplicación of Santiago, and the music of the Hymn of the Instituto Nacional General José Miguel Carrera; Parraguez worked at both schools as a teacher.

Parraguez married Ester Ortiz, with whom he had five children: Hernán, Flora, Julio, Waldo, and Gonzalo. Ismael Parraguez died unexpectedly aged 33 on 8 May 1917 in Santiago.

== Works ==
- Un idilio menos (1903)
- Poesías infantiles (1907)
- Orfeón Chileno (1914)
- Urbe; poema en dos cantos i un paréntesis, así: I. La ciudad viva (1915)
- Esperanza (1916)

Appeared in

- Selva lírica (anthology, 1917)
