= A Night Attack =

1917 poem by Australian poet Leon Gellert

- by Leon Gellert
- Written: 24 May 1915
- First published in: The Bulletin
- Country: Australia
- Language: English
- Publication date: 7 June 1917
- Lines: 13

"A Night Attack" (1917) is a poem by Australian poet Leon Gellert.

It was originally published in The Bulletin in June 1917, and was subsequently reprinted in the author's first single-author collection and in a number of Australian poetry anthologies.

== Synopsis ==
The poem describes the lead-up to a night attack during a war, concentrating on the intense feelings of the men waiting for their orders.

== Critical reception ==
Dan Disney, in his chapter "War, Crisis, and Identity in Australian Poetry" in The Cambridge Companion to Australian Poetry, emphasised Gellert's human reaction to the night attack as the poet situated "the war as peripherally close to a disembodied, synedochic collective of whispers shifting in abstract parts (the eye, the ear, footsteps, the hand, the mind) towards an impending fight. His poem places readers in heightened states of vigilance, and in so doing centralises anxiety as its motif."

== Publication history ==
After the poem's initial publication in The Bulletin it was reprinted as follows:

- Songs of a Campaign by Leon Gellert, 1917
- Poetry in Australia 1923
- Bards in the Wilderness : Australian Colonial Poetry to 1920 edited by Adrian Mitchell and Brian Elliott, Nelson, 1970
- Fighting Words : Australian War Writing edited by Carl Harrison-Ford, Lothian, 1986
- Australian Verse : An Oxford Anthology edited by John Leonard, Oxford University Press, 1998
- From Gallipoli to Gaza : The Desert Poets of World War One edited by Jill Hamilton, Simon and Schuster Australia, 2003
- An Anthology of Australian Poetry to 1920 edited by John Kinsella, University of Western Australia Library, 2007
- The Penguin Anthology of Australian Poetry edited by John Kinsella, Penguin, 2009
- The Puncher & Wattmann Anthology of Australian Poetry edited by John Leonard, Puncher & Wattmann, 2009
- Australian Poetry Since 1788 edited by Geoffrey Lehmann and Robert Gray, University of NSW Press, 2011
- From the Trenches : The Best Anzac Writing from World War One edited by Mark Dapin, Penguin, 2013

== See also ==
- 1917 in Australian literature
- 1917 in poetry
