= Pietro Baracchi =

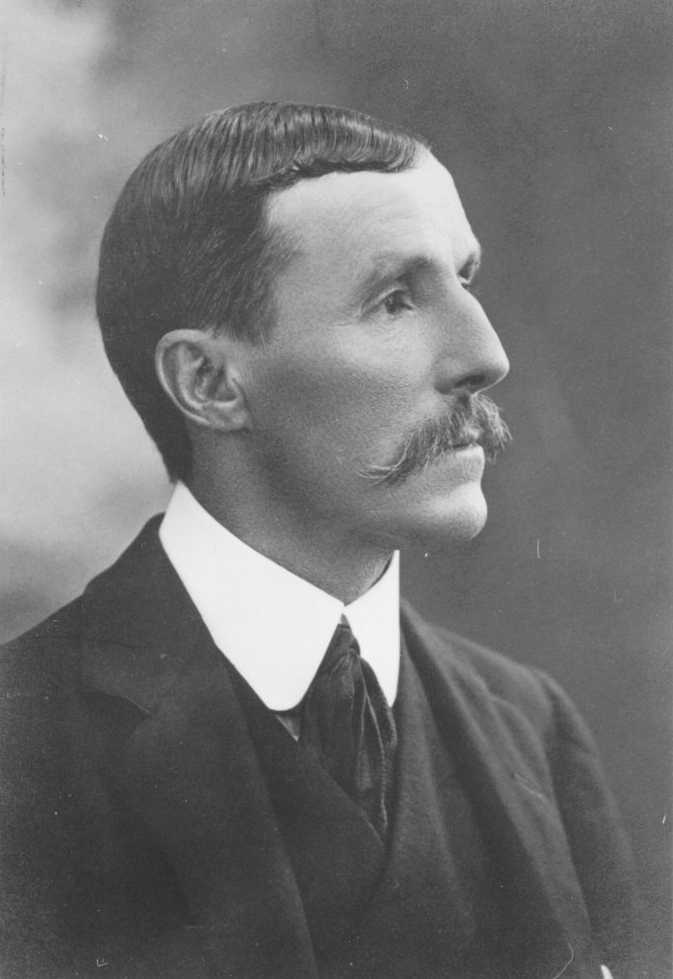

Pietro Paolo Giovanni Ernesto Baracchi (25 February 1851 – 23 July 1926) was a Grand Duchy of Tuscany-born astronomer, active in Australia and Government Astronomer of Victoria (Australia) 1900–15.

Baracchi was born in Florence, Grand Duchy of Tuscany, and took a degree in civil engineering. In 1876 he sailed for New Zealand, but soon moved on to Australia. He gained work as an assistant at the Melbourne Observatory and was selected to be transferred to Darwin. After completing his task there to measure longitudes, he returned to Melbourne and became an acting government astronomer on 30 June 1895 on Robert L. J. Ellery's retirement.

Baracchi was awarded the Order of Knight Commander of the Crown of Italy, 1897 and was president of the Royal Society of Victoria 1908–1909. He established the Mount Stromlo Observatory in 1910.

His wife died in 1908. Baracchi retired in 1915 and was succeeded as Government Astronomer of Victoria by Joseph M. Baldwin. In 1922 Baracchi visited Europe for two years and after his return he lived at the Melbourne Club. His son Guido Baracchi (1887–1975) was a founding member of the Communist Party of Australia.
