= I'm Like All Lovers =

Poem by Lesbia Harford

- by Lesbia Harford
- Original title: Poems XIV
- First published in: The Poems of Lesbia Harford (1941)
- Country: Australia
- Language: English
- Publication date: 1917

Full text
- I'm Like All Lovers at Wikisource

"I'm Like All Lovers" is a poem by Australian poet Lesbia Harford. It was written in 1917, though first published in the poet's collection The Poems of Lesbia Harford in 1941 under the title "Poems XIV", and later in other Australian poetry anthologies.

== Outline ==
A woman, the poet, speaks plainly to her man demanding that he ask no more of her than she asks of him, noting that she is free and so should he be, and that it is her love that sets him free, as long as he loves the woman in her. A very proto-feminist poem.

== Analysis ==
In his commentary on the poem in 60 Classic Australian Poems Geoff Page called the poem "curiously both modern and traditional." He also noted that in "1917 it may well have been ahead of its time (especially in Australia), but it has already outlived that time and promises to be around for quite a while yet".

== Further publications ==
- The Poems of Lesbia Harford edited by Drusilla Modjeska and Marjorie Pizer, 1985
- The New Oxford Book of Australian Verse edited by Les Murray, Oxford University Press, 1986
- The Oxford Book of Australian Love Poems edited by Jennifer Strauss, 1993
- Australian Verse : An Oxford Anthology edited by John Leonard, Oxford University Press, 1998
- Hell and After : Four Early English-language Poets of Australia edited by Les Murray, Carcanet 2005
- 60 Classic Australian Poems edited by Geoff Page, University of NSW Press, 2009
- The Puncher & Wattmann Anthology of Australian Poetry edited by John Leonard, Puncher & Wattmann, 2009
- 100 Australian Poems of Love and Loss edited by Jamie Grant, Grant Hardie, 2011
- Selected Poems edited by Gerald Murnane, Text Publishing, 2023

== See also ==
- 1917 in poetry
- 1917 in literature
- 1917 in Australian literature
- Australian literature
