= Guido Baracchi =

Australian left-wing political activist and writer

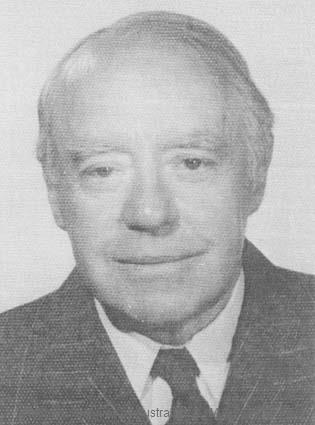
- ASIO surveillance photo of Baracchi
- Born: Guido Carlo Luigi Baracchi; 11 December 1887; South Yarra, Victoria, Australia
- Died: 13 December 1975 (aged 88); Penrith, New South Wales, Australia
- Education: University of Melbourne
- Political party: Communist Party of Australia (1920–1925; 1935–1940); Australian Labor Party (from 1962)
- Spouse(s): Kathleen Tobin (m. 1918; div. 1922) Harriet Zander (m. 1923, divorced) Ula Maddocks (m. 1946; div. 1962) Ethel Carson (m. 1962; died 1971)
- Partner: Betty Roland (1933–1942)

Guido Carlo Luigi Baracchi (11 December 1887 – 13 December 1975) was an Australian left-wing political activist and writer. He was independently wealthy and associated with a variety of causes. He was an anti-war activist during World War I and was involved with the Wobblies. In 1920 he was a foundation member of the Communist Party of Australia (CPA), from which he was expelled twice; he was also involved with communist parties in England and Germany and spent time in the Soviet Union. His second expulsion from the CPA in 1940 was for association with Trotskyism, for which he continued to advocate. He eventually joined the mainstream Australian Labor Party (ALP) in 1962.

== Early life ==
Baracchi was born on 11 December 1887 in South Yarra, Victoria. He was the only child of Kate (née Petty) and Pietro Baracchi. His mother was an Australian, while his father was an Italian-born astronomer who arrived in Australia in 1876 and became Victoria's government astronomer and a president of the Royal Society of Victoria.

Baracchi was educated at Melbourne Grammar School and studied classics at the University of Melbourne from 1904 to 1905, although he did not graduate. In later life he recalled that he had attended kindergarten with Richard Casey, school with S. M. Bruce and university with Robert Menzies.

Barrachi's parents both left him substantial inheritances which meant he had no need to work. His mother, who came from a "family of wealthy butchers", died in 1908 and left an inheritance of £32,519 (equivalent to $5,160,000 in 2022). By 1922 he was reportedly earning £1,000 per year (equivalent to $90,000 in 2022) from his mother's estate. After his father's death in 1926 he inherited a further £32,679 (equivalent to $2,940,000 in 2022).

== Activism ==
As a young man Baracchi considered himself a guild socialist. During World War I he "took a leading part in the anti-war movement" and in 1918 was convicted of offences under the War Precautions Act 1914, serving a three-month gaol sentence after refusing to pay the fine levied by the court. With encouragement from Lesbia Harford he joined the International Industrial Workers – created in place of the banned Industrial Workers of the World – and edited its journal Industrial Solidarity.

Baracchi was a founding member of the Communist Party of Australia (CPA) in 1920 and was co-editor with Percy Laidler of its official journal the Proletarian Review. In the early 1920s he spent several years in Europe, joining the Communist Party of Germany and editing the English-language edition of International Press Correspondence. He joined the Communist Party of Great Britain in 1924.

After returning to Australia, Baracchi was expelled from the CPA in 1925 after advocating for its dissolution on the grounds that it had failed to develop sufficient support. From 1926 to 1929 he lectured in economics at the pro-communist Victorian Labour College, which he had helped to establish. In 1932, Baracchi was refused readmission to the CPA but was entrusted with carrying correspondence to the Soviet Union on the party's behalf. He remained in Russia for over a year, working as a translator at the Co-Operative Publishing Society for Foreign Workers.

Baracchi was eventually re-admitted to the CPA in 1935. He moved to Sydney two years later where he was co-editor of the Communist Review. He was expelled from the party again in 1940 for his support for Trotskyism, which clashed with the Stalinist views of the party leadership. He subsequently "joined the small but eloquent group of Trotskyists in Sydney, speaking at their public meetings and contributing to their publications". He eventually joined the Australian Labor Party (ALP) in 1962, but continued to advocate for socialism.

== Personal life ==
Baracchi was legally married four times and had another de facto marriage. In 1918 he married Kathleen Tobin, an actress who had a daughter from a previous relationship. In 1922 Kathleen petitioned for divorce on the grounds that he had committed adultery with Harriett "Neura" Zander (née Whiteaway), a clothing designer. Zander's husband simultaneously petitioned for divorce on the same grounds, with both petitions granted.

Baracchi and Zander married in London in 1923, but later divorced. In 1933 he began a relationship with playwright Betty Roland. They separated in 1942 and in 1946 he married for a third time to Ula Maddocks (née Gray), a nurse. That marriage also ended in divorce and in 1962 he married artist Ethel Carson (née Cramp), an artist; he was widowed in 1971.

Baracchi died on 13 December 1975 in Penrith, New South Wales, aged 88, while campaigning for the ALP at the 1975 federal election.
