= Anzac Cove (poem) =

1916 poem by Australian poet Leon Gellert

- by Leon Gellert
- Written: January 1916
- First published in: Songs of a Campaign, 1917
- Country: Australia
- Language: English
- Lines: 12

"Anzac Cove" (1916) is a poem by Australian poet Leon Gellert.

It was originally published in the poet's collection Songs of a Campaign in 1917 and was subsequently reprinted in a number of Australian poetry anthologies.

== Synopsis ==
The poem is mostly concerned with a description of the landscape of ANZAC Cove on the Gallipoli peninsula in Turkey. It became famous as the site of World War I landing of the ANZACs (Australian and New Zealand Army Corps) on 25 April 1915. The poem does not provide any description of the battle fought there, but points to the suffering of those in Australia and New Zealand who lost loved ones there.

== Critical reception ==
In a review of the poet's collection Songs of a Campaign that was reported in The Graphic of Australia, J. W. S. Vroland noted that the poems in the volume "are practically all of them sad. There is not one jolly line." The review went on to point out the "simplicity and strength" of this particular poem.

The Anzac Portal webpage of The Department of Veterans' Affairs commented that "Of all the descriptions of Anzac Cove none is perhaps more evocative than that of soldier-poet Leon Gellert", before reprinting the full text of the poem.

== Publication history ==
After the poem's initial publication in Songs of a Campaign it was reprinted as follows:

- Selections from Australian Poets edited by Bertram Stevens and George Mackaness, Cornstalk Publishing, 1925
- From the Ballads to Brennan edited by T. Inglis Moore, Angus & Robertson, 1964
- Age Literary Review, 24 April 1965
- Other Banners : An Anthology of Australian Literature of the First World War edited by J. T. Laird, Australian War Memorial and The Australian Publishing Service, 1971
- The Illustrated Treasury of Australian Verse edited by Beatrice Davis, Nelson, 1984
- New Dimension, April 1985
- Poems for All Occasions edited by Ron Pretty, Five Islands Press, 2002
- From Gallipoli to Gaza : The Desert Poets of World War One edited by Jill Hamilton, Simon and Schuster Australia, 2003
- The Canberra Times, 8 November 2003
- Cobbers : Stories of Gallipoli 1915 edited by Jim Haynes, ABC Books, 2005
- Two Centuries of Australian Poetry edited by Kathrine Bell, Gary Allen, 2007
- The Book of Australian Popular Rhymed Verse: A Classic Collection of Entertaining and Recitable Poems and Verse: From Henry Lawson to Barry Humphries edited by Jim Haynes, ABC Books, 2008
- From the Trenches : The Best Anzac Writing from World War One edited by Mark Dapin, Penguin, 2013
- International Poetry of the First World War : An Anthology of Lost Voices edited Constance M. Ruzich, Bloomsbury, 2020

== See also ==
- 1916 in Australian literature
- 1916 in poetry
