= Susie Frances Harrison =

Canadian poet, novelist, music critic and music composer

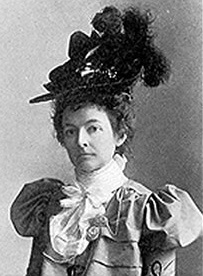
- Born: Susan Frances Riley; February 24, 1859; Toronto, Canada West
- Died: May 5, 1935 (aged 76); Toronto, Ontario
- Citizenship: British subject
- Occupations: Composer, writer, pianist
- Spouse: J.W.F. Harrison
- Writing career
- Pen name: Medusa, Seranus, Gilbert King
- Language: English
- Notable works: Pine, Rose, and Fleur-de-Lys

Signature
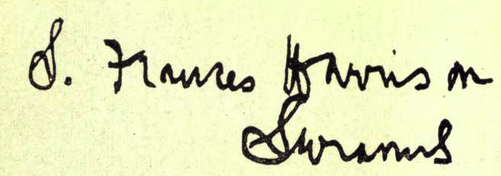

Susan Frances Harrison, née Riley (February 24, 1859 – May 5, 1935), known by the pen-name Seranus, was a Canadian poet, novelist, music critic and music composer who lived and worked in Ottawa and Toronto.

== Life ==
Susie Frances Riley was born in Toronto of Irish-Canadian ancestry, the daughter of John Byron Riley. She studied music with Frederic Boscovitz, at a private school for girls in Toronto, and later in Montreal. She reportedly began publishing poetry, in the Canadian Illustrated News, at 16 under the pseudonym "Medusa." After completing her education, she worked as a pianist and singer. In 1880 she married organist John W. F. Harrison, of Bristol, England, who was the organist of St. George's Church in Montreal. The couple had a son and a daughter.

The Harrisons lived in Ottawa in 1883, when Susie Harrison composed the song "Address of Welcome to Lord Lansdowne" to celebrate the first public appearance of the new Governor General, the Marquess of Lansdowne.

In 1887, the Harrisons moved to Toronto, where John Harrison became organist and choirmaster of St. Simon the Apostle, and Susan Harrison began a literary career under the pseudonym "Seranus" (a misreading of her signature, "S. Frances"), soon publishing articles in "many of the leading journals and periodicals."

She wrote a number of songs published in the United States and England under the name Seranus, and published other songs in England under the name, Gilbert King.

She was the music critic of The Week from December 1886 to June 1887 under her pen-name of Seranus. She wrote the "Historical sketch on Canadian music" for the 1898 Canada: An Encyclopedia of the Country.

Susan Harrison was considered an authority on folk music, and often lectured on the subject. She used traditional Irish melodies in her String Quartet on Ancient Irish Airs, and French-Canadian music in her 1887 Trois Esquisses canadiennes (Three Canadian Sketches), 'Dialogue,' 'Nocturne,' and 'Chant du voyageur'. She also incorporated French-Canadian melodies in her three-act opera, Pipandor (with libretto by F.A. Dixon of Ottawa).

Her String Quartet on Ancient Irish Airs, is likely the first string quartet composed in Canada by a woman.

In 1896 and 1897, she presented a series of well-received lectures in Toronto on "The Music of French Canada.

For 20 years, Harrison was the principal of the Rosedale branch of the Toronto Conservatory of Music. During the 1900s she contributed to and edited the Conservatory's publication Conservatory Monthly, and contributed to its successor Conservatory Quarterly Review. She wrote the article on "Canada" for the 1909 Imperial History and Encyclopedia of Music.

In addition, she wrote at least six books of poetry, and three novels.

== Writing ==
=== Poetry ===
Harrison's musical training is reflected in her poetry: "she was adept in her handling of the rhythmic complexities of poetic forms such as the sonnet and the villanelle. Like other Canadian poets of the late nineteenth century, her prevailing themes include nature, love, and patriotism. Her landscape poetry, richly influenced by the works of Charles G.D. Roberts and Archibald Lampman, paints the Canadian wilderness as beguilingly beautiful yet at the same time mysterious and distant."

Harrison was a master of the villanelle. The villanelle was a French verse form that had been introduced to English readers by Edmund Gosse in his 1877 essay, "A Plea for Certain Exotic Forms of Verse".

=== Novels ===
Her two novels "articulate a fascination with a heavily mythologized Quebec culture that Harrison shared with many English-speaking Canadians of her time ... characterized by a gothic emphasis on horror, madness, aristocratic seigneurial manor houses, and a decadent Catholicism." "Harrison writes elegiacally of a regime whose romantic qualities are largely the creation of an Upper Canadian quest for a distinctive historical identity."

== Recognition ==
Harrison experienced a decline in reputation in her lifetime. In 1916 anthologist John Garvin called her "one of our greater poets whose work has not yet had the recognition in Canada it merits.". "By 1926, Garvin describes her merely as 'one of our distinctive poets'."

The Dictionary of Literary Biography wrote of Susan Frances Harrison, in 1990, that "Harrison's unpublished work has not been preserved, her published work is out of print and difficult to obtain, and her once-substantial position in the literary life of her country is now all but forgotten."

== Publications ==
=== Selected songs ===
- Song of Welcome.
- Pipandor. opera
- ''Trois Esquisses canadiennes: 'Dialogue,' 'Nocturne,' 'Chant du voyageur'. 1887.
- Quartet on Ancient Irish Airs.

=== Poetry ===
- Four Ballads and a Play. Toronto: Author, 1890.
- Pine, Rose and Fleur De Lis. Toronto: Hart, 1891.
- In Northern Skies and Other Poems. Toronto: Author, 1912.
- Songs of Love and Labor. Toronto: Author, 1925.
- Later Poems and New Villanelles. Toronto: Ryerson, 1928.
- Penelope and Other Poems. Toronto: Author, 1934.

Bibliographical information on poems from Wanda Campbell, Hidden Rooms.

=== Prose ===
- Crowded Out and Other Sketches. Ottawa: Evening Journal, 1886.
- The Forest of Bourg-Marie, novel. Toronto: G.N. Morang, 1898.
- Ringfield, novel. London: Hodder & Stoughton, 1914.

=== Edited ===
- Canadian Birthday Book. Toronto: Robinson, 1887. Poetry anthology.

=== Articles ===
- "Historical sketch of music in Canada," Canada: An Encyclopedia of the Country, vol 4, J.C. Hopkins ed., Toronto, 1898.
- "Canada," The Imperial History and Encyclopedia of Music, vol 3: History of Foreign Music, W.L. Hubbard ed., New York ca 1909.

== Discography ==
Harrison's piano music has been recorded and issued on media, including:

- Keillor, Elaine. By a Canadian Lady Piano Music 1841-1997 Carleton Sound
- Keillor, Elaine. Piano Music by Torontonians (1984)
