= Daulat Ram =

Indian politician

Daulat Ram Kirar was an Indian politician from the state of the Madhya Pradesh. He represented Guna Vidhan Sabha constituency of undivided Madhya Pradesh Legislative Assembly by winning General election of 1957.
