= Lucy Creemer Peckham =

Dr. Lucy Creemer Peckham
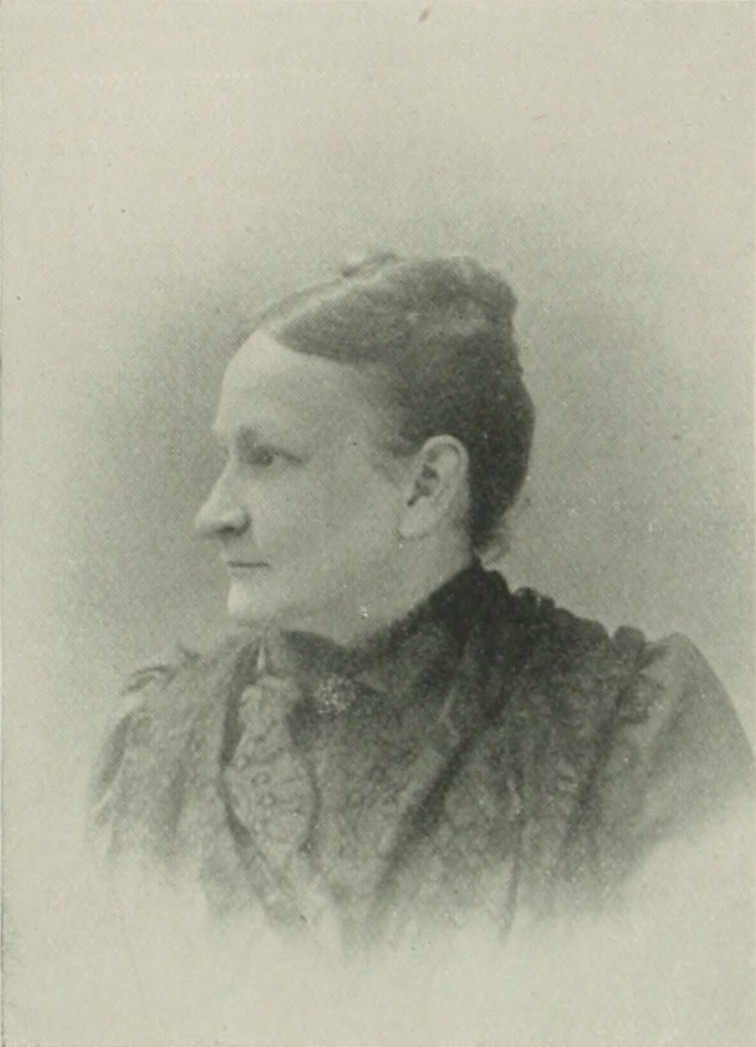
- Portrait photo from A Woman of the Century
- Born: Lucy Gore; March 27, 1842; Milford, Connecticut, U.S.
- Died: August 21, 1923 (aged 81); New Haven, Connecticut
- Education: New Haven School for Nurses; Woman's Medical College of Pennsylvania
- Spouses: Charles N. Creemer (m. 1865; died 1878); John A. Peckham (m. 1889; died 1905)
- Medical career
- Profession: nurse (1880–82); physician (1885–1923); poet
- Institutions: House of Mercy hospital
- Notable works: Sea Moss, 1891

Signature
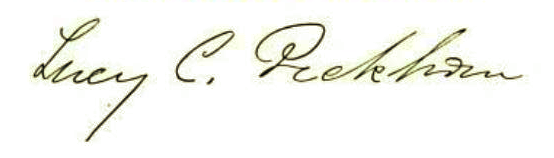

Dr. Lucy Creemer Peckham (née, Gore; after first marriage, Creemer; after second marriage, Peckham; 1842–1923) was an American nurse, physician, and poet. She was a pioneer of women in medical practice in Connecticut.

== Biography ==
Lucy Gore was born in Milford, Connecticut, March 27, 1842. Her father, Joshua R. Gore, was a native of Hamden, Connecticut, and his parents and grandparents were from Connecticut. Her ancestors on the maternal side were among the first settlers of the old town of Milford. Her mother's name was Mary Smith. Lucy was the oldest of four children, and when she was about seven years of age, the family removed to New Haven, Connecticut, and the children were all educated in the public schools of that city. From the age of 18 to 23, Lucy helped the family financially through her needlework.

On July 25, 1865, she married Charles N. Creemer, of New York, who died in 1878, or 1885.

She gained entrance to the New Haven School for Nurses, in the hospital, and faithfully discharged the duties of nurse until she was graduated. In August 1880, she was sent to Pittsfield, Massachusetts to take charge of the House of Mercy hospital. There she remained two years (1880–82).

As the work opened before her, she realized that a more thorough knowledge of medical science would give her a still larger scope. She resolved to enter college and pursue the regular curriculum. In 1882, she matriculated in the Woman's Medical College of Pennsylvania in Philadelphia, and was graduated in 1885.

Since that year, she practiced medicine in her old home, New Haven.

On August 30, 1889, she was married a second time. On the suggestion of her husband, John A. Peckham (died 1905), she selected 43 poems, which she had written and published at intervals during many years, and had them published in book form, with the title Sea Moss (Buffalo, 1891). She also made many contributions to magazines and newspapers.

In religion, Peckham was a Universalist.

Dr. Lucy Creemer Peckham died August 21, 1923, at New Haven.

== Selected works ==
- Sea Moss, 1891 (text)
