= Jevons Block =

1917 poetry book by Kate Buss

- Title page
- Author: Kate Buss
- Language: English
- Publisher: McGrath-Sherrill Press
- Publication date: 1917
- Publication place: United States
- Media type: Print
- Pages: 53 pp
- OCLC: 18004454
- Text: Jevons Block at Wikisource

Jevons Block: A Book of Sex Enmity is a poetry book by Kate Buss published in 1917.

== Contents ==
Described as "a small book of poetry," the publication is a collection of works by Buss that were first printed in various periodicals. It has a cover height of 19 centimetres (7.5 in), and is illustrated with twenty portraits.

It was printed in Boston in 1917, by McGrath-Sherrill Press.

== Reception ==
Jevons Block was called a modernized and gendered Spoon River by Linda Wagner-Martin.

== Sources ==
- The Bookman. Vol. 45. Dodd, Mead and Co. 1917.
- Catalogue of Copyright Entries. Vol. 15. Library of Congress, Copyright Office. 1918.
- Wagner-Martin, Linda (1997). Favored Strangers: Gertrude Stein and Her Family. Rutgers University Press. p. 368. ISBN 9780813524740.
