= Susan Archer Weiss =

American poet

Susan Archer Talley Weiss
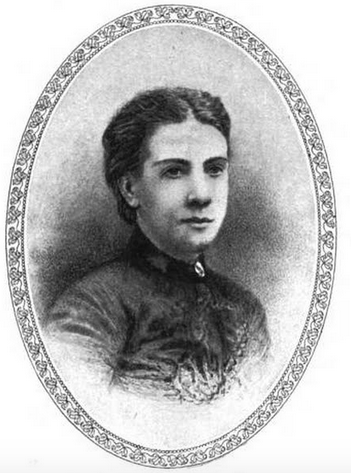
- Photo in The Century Illustrated Monthly Magazine, 1904
- Born: Susan Archer Talley; February 14, 1822; Hanover County, Virginia, U.S.
- Died: April 7, 1917 (aged 95); Richmond, Virginia, U.S.
- Resting place: Riverview Cemetery, Richmond, Virginia
- Occupation: Poet
- Spouse: Col. von Weiss (m. 1863; died 1869)
- Writing career
- Genre: poetry
- Notable work: Poems

Susan Archer Weiss (née, Talley; February 14, 1822 – April 7, 1917) was an American poet. Losing her hearing as a child, she rarely mingled in society beyond a select circle of friends, finding her happiness in her home. Her life was essentially that of a poet, though she also painted. In September 1859, a collection of her poems was issued by Rudd & Carlton, of New York City. Her name was included among those of young writers in American Female Poets, Sarah Josepha Hale's Woman's Record, and other similar works. Weiss was a friend of Edgar Allan Poe. She died in 1917.

== Early life and education ==
Susan Archer Talley was born in Hanover County, Virginia, February 14, 1822, (Note: While Willard & Livermore (1893) record Susan's year of birth as 1835, the University of Southern California mentions that 1835 is incorrect.) on the plantation of her paternal grandfather. She was descended from a French Huguenot who, escaping the St. Bartholomew's Day massacre, fled to the United States, and settled in Virginia. This grandfather served in Lee's Legion of the American Revolutionary War. Her father studied law under Judge Robert Taylor of Norfolk, Virginia. Her mother was a daughter of Captain Archer, of one of the oldest and most distinguished families of Norfolk.

Weiss passed her first eight years on the plantation, after which, the family moved to Richmond, Virginia, when on account of ill health, her father had resigned the practice of his profession, and retired. It was in Richmond that she entered school. Though of an exceedingly happy temperament, Weiss rarely mingled with other children, but would spend most of her time in reading, study, or in wandering amid the woods and meadows that surrounded her father's residence.

At nine years of age, she suddenly and entirely lost her hearing due to scarlet fever, making it necessary to remove her from school. She had been quick at learning, and in the brief period of her school life, had advanced rapidly, so that the slight knowledge thus acquired served as a foundation for her future self-education. When she was ten years old, she developed a talent for drawing, which her father took pains to cultivate. Her crayon drawings, many of them original in design, and especially her miniature portraits, were remarkable for their execution and finish. She exhibited equal skill in watercolors and oil painting.

At the age of eleven, by accident, some of her verses were read by her father. He showed them to Benjamin Blake Minor, editor of the Southern Literary Messenger, who published them in his magazine, where, in a few years, her contributions attracted much attention.

It may be said that from the time when she left school until she was sixteen, her life was passed in the solitude of her home, where she seemed to derive from books a constant and ever-increasing enjoyment. It was not until she was in her fifteenth year that the nature and force of her talents were noticed by her most intimate associates. She became interested in the work of her cousin, the sculptor, Alexander Gait (1827- 1863), and spent many hours in his studio. One day he gave her a small block of plaster, out of which, without assistance or model, she cut with a pen-knife a female head so plainly the work of genius that Gait took it with him to Italy, where it was seen by Thomas Crawford and Horatio Greenough, who were enthusiastic in their desire that she should devote herself to sculpture, but her father's death hindered her from doing so.

== Career ==
After Weiss' family removed from Richmond to a suburban residence, she became absorbed in her pictures and her writing and in the society of a choice circle of friends, where she led a happy life. In 1859, she had a volume of her poems printed in a small edition and distributed among editors and critics, by whom it was received with flattering notice, but the commencement of the Civil War, interfering with literary enterprises, prevented the publishing of a second edition in those years. During the war, she was deprived of her home, which had been converted into a fortification for the defense of the city. She thus became, for some time, a resident between the two opposing armies. During the Civil War, she was accused by the National authorities of being a spy, and was arrested and imprisoned at Fort McHenry, Baltimore. While there, in 1863, she married Col. von Weiss (d. 1869), a German officer, of the Union army, with whom she, for some years, resided in New York City. The marriage proved an unhappy one, and she was compelled to sue for divorce and possession of their only child. As she declined to accept alimony, and had been by the war deprived of nearly all her property, she decided to support herself and child by writing prose and stories. She contributed to New York City newspapers, to Harper's, Scribner's, and other magazines, until she developed a painful eye condition, which for some years incapacitated her from writing.

== Personal life ==
In later years, she resided with her son, in Richmond, Virginia.

Susan Archer Weiss died in Richmond, Virginia, April 7, 1917.

== Style ==
What is most noticeable in Weiss' poems is their rhythmical harmony. A similar versification style was noted in the work of James M. Nack, the deaf poet of New York, whose writings were published several years earlier by Prosper Montgomery Wetmore. There was not in Nack's poems, however, any single composition that could be compared with "Ennerslie", in grace, or variety of cadences. It was said that this poem, without being an imitation, would remind the reader of one of the finest productions of Alfred, Lord Tennyson.

== Selected works ==
- The home life of Poe
- Poems
- The battle of Manassas
- Con Elgin
- Eld
- Lady Claire
- Past and Present
- The Soul's Creed
- Airley
- The Sibyl
