= Songs of a Campaign =

1917 poetry collection by Leon Gellert

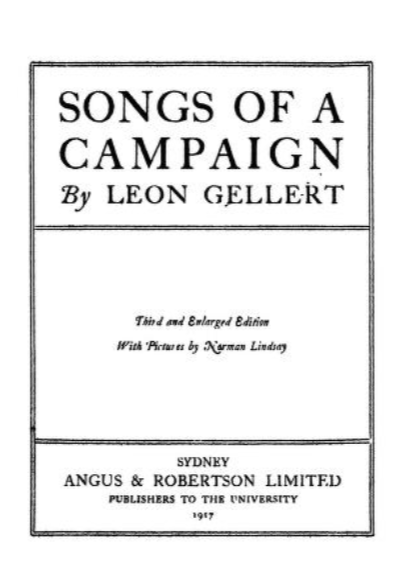
- Title page for Songs of a Campaign (1917)
- Author: Leon Gellert
- Language: English
- Genre: Poetry collection
- Publisher: Angus and Robertson
- Publication date: 1917
- Publication place: Australia
- Media type: Print
- Pages: 124 pp
- Preceded by: -
- Followed by: Desperate Measures

Songs of a Campaign is a poetry collection by Australian poet and writer Leon Gellert, published by Angus and Robertson, in 1917.

The first edition contains 43 poems with all being published here for the first time. Several were later published in numerous Australian newspapers and periodicals.

== Dedication ==
- The third edition of this collections carries the following dedication:

"With acknowledgments to Miss E. Milne Bundey, Mus. Bac."

== Contents ==
Contents of the first edition:

- "Ease, 1914"
- "The Coming of War, 1915"
- "The Trumpets of Heaven, 1916"
- "The Riddle of the Sphinx"
- "The Song's End"
- "Dreamlight"
- "A Song"
- "A Military Camp in Egypt"
- "'If You Were Here'"
- "The Old and the New"
- "Armageddon"
- "Dreams of France"
- "Through a Porthole"
- "Lemnos Visited"
- "Lemnos Revisited"
- "The Three Concerned"
- "Again the Clash is East"
- "Red"
- "Before Action"
- "Now 'Neath the Cool Stars"
- "The Death"
- "The Burial"
- "A Night Attack"
- "The Grey World"
- "One Who Died"
- "The Soldier"
- "In the Trench"
- "These Men"
- "The Teacher"
- "The Diggers"
- "The Wrecked Aeroplane"
- "The Jester in the Trench"
- "Anzac Cove"
- "Requiem (The Last to Leave)"
- "The Dead"
- "The Consumptive"
- "The Epileptic"
- "The Blind Man"
- "The Cripple"
- "A Book of Wordsworth"
- "Blind!"
- "The River"
- "The Australian Muse"

== Critical reception ==
A reviewer in The Age attempted to put the book into context: "Leon Gellert has done what no other Australian verse writer has yet attempted. He has given a complete history of a soldier-poet's experience of war. That is not to say that his volume of poems is a history of the Gallipoli campaign written in verse. It is a history, rather, of the moods of a poet soldiering through the campaign. The work opens with three preparatory sonnets, in the second of which the coming of war is described, not so much as something loathsome as something mighty and irresistible."

A writer in The Sydney Morning Herald was rather effusive in their praise: "The Songs show a correctness and the fondness for classical allusion that one associates with academic verse, but have qualities of their own which make all other prize poems one has read of all other universities schoolboy exercises by comparison. Mr. Gellert joined the Australian force, fought through the Gallipoli campaign, and was wounded. These verses, written in trench and hospital, are extraordinarily fine; indeed, it is not too much to say that they surpass all the other poetry hitherto inspired by that great adventure, and it is satisfactory to think that the Anzacs have supplied its best interpreter."

The Oxford Companion to Australian Literature states: "In 1917 he published Songs of a Campaign which won the University of Adelaide's Bundey prize for poetry and established Gellert as the soldier-poet of the day. In eloquent poems such as 'Through a Porthole', 'Patience', 'The Burial', 'The Diggers' and 'Attack at Dawn', Gellert recorded the dignity and courage of the soldier caught haplessly in the futility of war."

== Publication history ==
After the initial publication of the collection by Angus and Robertson in 1917, it was reissued as follows:

- Angus and Robertson, Australia, 1917
- Angus and Robertson, Australia, 1917 — this and the following editions included extra material and were illustrated by Norman Lindsay
- Angus and Robertson, Australia, 1918

Evidence of a fourth edition has not, at this time, been determined.

== See also ==
- 1917 in Australian literature
- The "AllPoetry" website has reproduced a number of Gellert's poems.
