= May Herschel-Clarke =

English poet

May Herschel-Clarke (1894–1955) was an English poet born on 19 March 1894. She is chiefly known today for her Anti-War poems Nothing to Report and The Mother, the latter of which was published in 1917 as a direct response to Rupert Brooke's famous poem The Soldier. She was the daughter of Charles Frederick Clarke and Minnie Emma Clarke who at the time of the 1901 census were living in Plumstead. Her father was a surgeon.

Clarke is best remembered for her poems in Behind the Firing Lines which was published in 1917. It received a little attention and a rather condescending review from The Athenaeum in December 1917.

Clark had other things published too. She received prize money from the Bookman and wrote to and for local and national publications.

As a young woman she was an outspoken feminist with strong opinions about women and work. After the war, she wrote extensively about the film industry.

Herschel-Clarke died in 1955.
