= Leon Gellert =

Australian poet

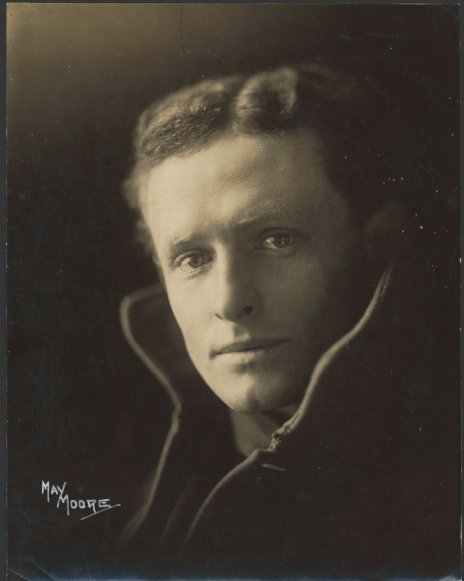
- Born: Leon Maxwell Gellert; 17 May 1892; Walkerville, South Australia
- Died: 22 August 1977 (aged 85); Toorak Gardens, South Australia
- Occupations: poet and writer
- Writing career
- Language: English
- Years active: 1917-1974

Leon Maxwell Gellert (17 May 1892 – 22 August 1977) was an Australian poet.

== Early life and education ==
He was born in Walkerville, a suburb of Adelaide, South Australia. He was the grandchild of Hungarian immigrants. He was subjected to bullying by his father to which he reacted by learning self-defence at the YMCA.

After an education at Adelaide High School, he embarked on a teaching career; first as a student-teacher at Unley High School then at the University of Adelaide's Teacher Training College.

He enlisted with the Australian Imperial Forces 10th Battalion within weeks of the outbreak of the Great War and sailed for Cairo on 22 October 1914. He landed at Ari Burnu Beach, Gallipoli on 25 April 1915, was wounded and repatriated as medically unfit in June 1916. He attempted to re-enlist but was soon found out. He returned to teaching at Norwood Public School.

== Writing career ==
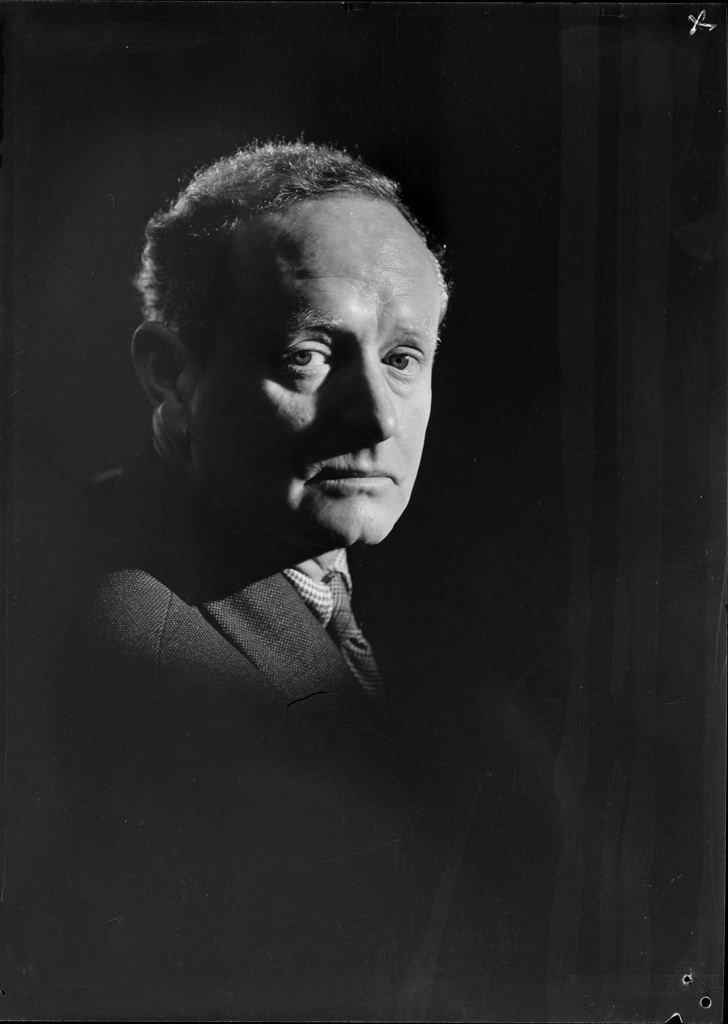
Portrait of Leon Gellert, Sydney, 1937

During periods of inactivity he had been indulging his appetite for writing poetry. Songs of a Campaign (1917) was his first published book of verse, and was favourably reviewed by The Bulletin. Angus & Robertson soon published a new edition, illustrated by Norman Lindsay. His second, The Isle of San (1919), also illustrated by Lindsay, was not so well received. He took to journalism, moving to Sydney, where he taught English at Cleveland Street Intermediate High School until 1922 when he joined the staff at Smith's Weekly. There he was introduced to the circle that included Sydney Ure Smith and Bertram Stevens. He was appointed editor of Ure Smith's Home magazine and co-editor of the quarterly Art in Australia, which he took over on Stevens' death in 1922.

John Fairfax took over Ure Smith Publications in 1934, Ure Smith and Gellert retaining their positions until 1938 when Ure Smith retired. Gellert continued editing Home until 1942 when it ceased publication. He then became literary editor of the Sydney Morning Herald, writing a column 'Something Personal' in the Saturday issues as well as humorous columns for the Sunday Herald and the Sunday Telegraph.

He returned to Adelaide after the death of his wife Kathleen in 1969, living in the suburb of Hazelwood Park, and died eight years later. Their only child, a daughter, died in childbirth in the 1940s.

He was subject of a dry-point portrait by Norman Lindsay and a 1923 oil painting by Norman Carter. His biography A Torrent of Words (ISBN 0909422265) was written by Gavin Souter.

Christchurch-based composer Richard Oswin made use of his poem "The Last to Leave" in his choral work commissioned by the New Zealand Secondary Students' Choir, Three Gallipoli Settings. The poem provided the text for the second of the three settings.

== Bibliography ==
=== Poetry collections ===
- Songs of a Campaign (1917)
- Desperate Measures (1928)
- Those Beastly Australians : Some Faunagraphic Data Compiled for Students of Australian Wild Life illustrated by Bernard Hesling (1944)

==== Selected list of poems ====
Title	Year	First published	Reprinted/collected in
"Anzac Cove"	1916		Songs of a Campaign by Leon Gellert, Angus and Robertson, 1917, p. 41
"A Night Attack"	1917	The Bulletin, 15 March 1944, p4	Songs of a Campaign by Leon Gellert, Angus and Robertson, 1917, p. 51

=== Short story collections ===
- Week After Week (1953)
- Year After Year (1956)

== See also ==
- http://oldpoetry.com/opoem/41043-Leon-Gellert-In-The-Trench
