= Douglas Smith Huyghue =

Canadian and Australian writer

Douglas Smith Huyghue (1816–1891) was a British North American and Colony of Victoria poet, fiction writer, essayist, and artist.

== Biography ==
Born April 23, 1816, in Charlottetown, Prince Edward Island, to an impoverished British lieutenant, it is believed Douglas Smith Huyghue was educated at the Saint John Grammar School. His first published poetry was in the Halifax Morning Post and Parliamentary Reporter, where his work appeared under the pseudonym 'Eugene'. In the early 1840s, he began regularly contributing poetry, short fiction, and essays to the literary magazine Amaranth, published in Saint John, New Brunswick. His novel, Argimou: A Legend of the Micmac, was serialized in Amaranth in 1842 and was first published in book form in 1847. At that time Huyghue also assisted province's commissioner of Indian affairs in arranging an exhibition of Indian artefacts. In the late 1840s, he moved to England, where he published a three-volume novel, Nomades of the West; or, Ellen Clayton (1850), and then immigrated to Australia on the Lady Peel in 1852. In 1853, he became a clerk in the Office of Mines in the Ballarat goldfields, where he witnessed the Eureka Stockade revolt of 1854. His watercolor, "The Eureka Stockade," is exhibited at the Ballarat Fine Art Gallery. He continued working as a civil servant in Ballarat and Graytown, his last post being at the Department of Mines in Melbourne. He died July 24, 1891.

== Works ==
- Nomades of the West; or, Ellen Clayton, 3 volumes. London: Bentley, 1850.
- Argimou: A Legend of the Micmac, with an afterword by Gwendolyn Davies. Waterloo: Wilfrid Laurier University Press, 2017. Early Canadian Literature series.

=== Publications in Periodicals ===
'Recollections of Canada. The Scenery of the Ottawa,' Bentley's Miscellany (1849): 489–497.

'A Winter's Journey,' Bentley's Miscellany (1849): 630–638.

'My First Winter in the Woods of Canada,' Bentley's Miscellany (1850): 152–160.

'Forest Incidents—Recollections of Canada,' Bentley's Miscellany (1850): 472–477.
