= Selva Lirica =

Selva lirica is an anthology published in 1917 by the Chilean Julio Molina Nuñez.

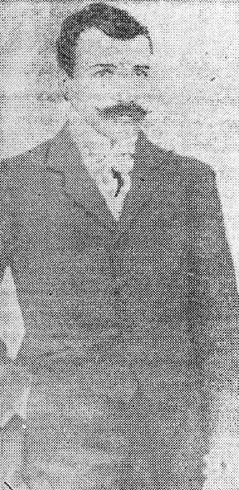

Julio Molina Nuñez (1884-?) was a Chilean poet and critic; known for his controversial anthology “Selva Lirica” (published in 1917) in which the poetry of numerous Chilean authors was carefully analyzed, discussed and criticized. This anthology includes the first recorded critique of Gabriela Mistral, who twenty-eight years later won the Nobel Prize of Literature (1945). Julio Molina was the first person to predict her success as a poet

"...we are sure that soon there will be a revelation and a beautiful hope for all the spanish words... and in the spanish literature, we have yet to see poetry of equal caliber to what we have seen..."

== Motivations to write the Anthology ==
It is evident that Julio Molina Nuñez was motivated to improve the quality of writers in Chile. The book starts with Mr. Molina calling upon the poetic youth of Chile to become innovators without deserting the older art.

" ...[to the youth] Do not desert the Older Art, you have to study it and take advantage of its projections..."

On September 6, 1912, Julio Molina Nuñez and his assistant Juan Agustín Araya invited all the writers of the country to submit their poems to be included in the most complete anthology to the date. People responded with immense enthusiasm without any suspicion of the real intention of Mr. Molina, which included not only the object to create an anthology, but also to offer an intense study of the poetic activity of Chile.

Selva Lirica was probably inspired by the celebrations of the centenary. The authors installed all their materials in Molina’s Office (Morandé 458, Santiago) where they began the study, discussion, analysis and redaction of Selva Lirica, published in 1917.

== Criticism ==
Selva Lirica was applauded and strongly criticized, mainly because of the chronological organization. Many of the so-called "versificators", those considered bad poets in the book, threatened Julio Molina with death.

== Chronological organization ==
The first part of the book consists of the good poets, including Manuel Magallanes Moure, Francisco Contreras and others.

Between the so-called “promising authors” Vicente Huidobro and Lucila Godoy (Gabriela Mistral) are found. These findings show the deep vision and understanding of the author since both of them became one of the greatest poets of the Spanish language. Pablo Neruda is not mention in this anthology because in those years he was just starting as a writer.

The Second part includes poets with classical and romantic tendencies next to other poets that are difficult to classify. The most controversial section in which the biggest polemics arose were the last part dedicated to the bad poets or “versificatiors” as called by the authors.

== Importance ==
Selva Lirica became the most important Chilean book in 1917, in which names of the fathers and mothers of Chilean poetry of the 20th century were announced. For its impact and transcendences of the Chilean Literary History, the "Bibliotecas Archivos y Museos" (DIBAM) and the LOM Ediciones, decided to publish a rendition to this polemic anthology in 1995.

Pablo Neruda (Nobel Prize winner 1976) mentioned Selva Lirica in his book “Confieso que he Vivido” (published in 1974)

"...Selva Lirica. This was the romantic title of the great anthology of Julio Molina Nuñez... this is a book that has everything, full of greatness and generosity. This is the poetic pen of a confused time...[Selva Lirica is full of] extremely pure splendor..."

== Important quotes from the book ==
=== Promising authors ===
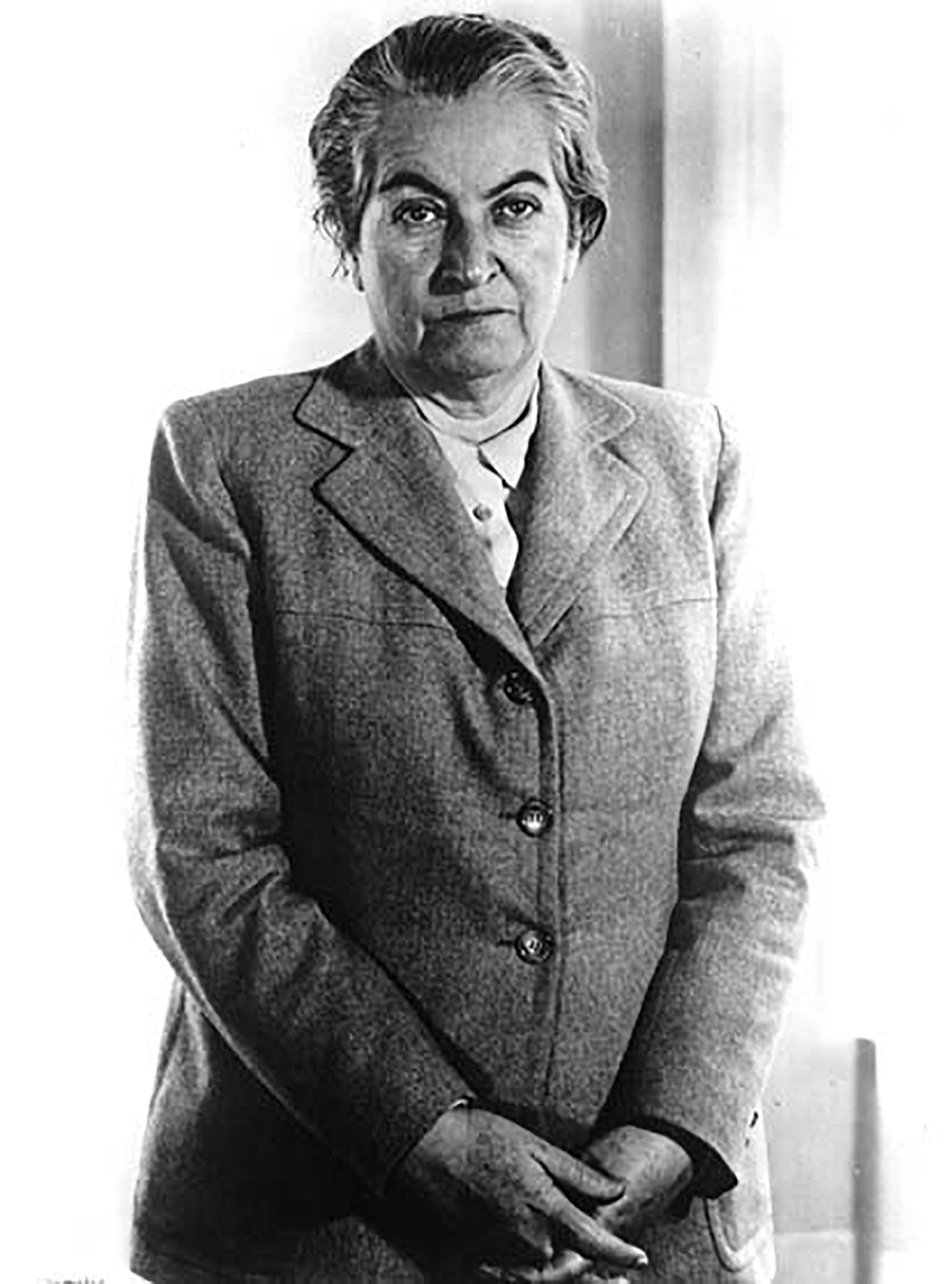

About Lucila Godoy (Gabriela Mistral)

"...Cuando sus estrofas hablan al corazón del universo, invocando la majestad de la naturaleza o estrechando entre sus brazos amantes las dóciles cabecitas infantiles, adquieren un acento de sagrada admiración, inspiraciones solemnes, suavidad de regazos maternales y ternuras nazarenas..."

"...When her verses speak to the universe, invoking the majesty of nature, or stretching between her loving arms the docile little infantile heads, acquire a sacred accent of admiration, solemn inspirations, suave in her maternal laps, nazarene tenderness..."

Los Sonetos De La Muerte" Gabriela Mistral, 1914''

"...Los sonetos de la muerte... son un grito obsesor de pasión y dolor, de venganza y piedad, arrancando como la venda de una herida sangrante, a su joven alma de artista, que vació en veriles versos acerados sus más puros sentimientos de nobleza, piedras preciosas extraidas entre los humores del mundo y que entre sus dedos tumultuosos y finos adquieren las esplendentes proyecciones de la más bella filosofía simbolista."

"...Los Sonetos de la muerte... are a cry of passion and pain, shamefulness and piety, it is like taking out a bandage of a bloody bruise, her young artistic soul that emptied in ridged verses steely her most pure noble feelings, beautiful stones extracted between world's moods, and between her tumultuous fingers and finely acquire the most resplendent projections of the most beautiful symbolist philosophy."

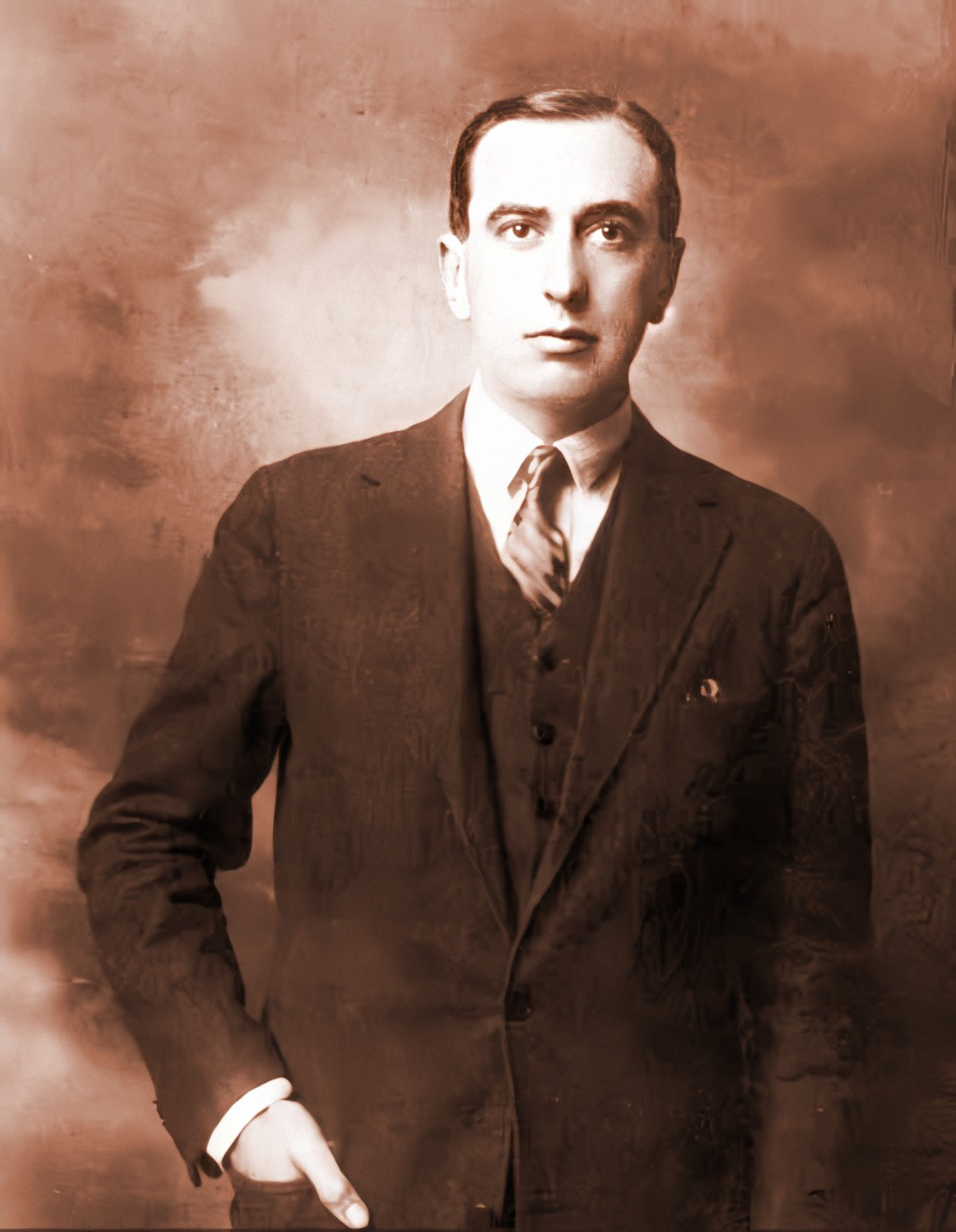

About Vicente Huidobro

"...Éste muchacho artísta es un carácter...Vicente Huidobro es un orgulloso... [él] es un temperamento, nada teme ni nada le importa... En uno de sus más ardientes libros dice ‹‹Tengo completa fé en mi mismo. Tengo tal seguridad de las cosas que si el mismísimo Dios me atacara, lo sentía mucho por él... Siempre he tenido la seguridad que yo haré mi obra y llegaré al triunfo; por eso no temo gritar alabanzas con todos mis pulmones a los que creo las merecen. Si ellos hacen su obra, yo también haré la mía. Si ellos llegan al triunfo, yo también estoy seguro de llegar›› Nosotros creemos lo miso. [él] Llegará [al triunfo]..."

"... This young artist is a character... Vicente Huidobro is a proud-hearted... [he] is a temperament, nothing scares him, and nothing matters to him... In one of his most burning books, he says the following quote ‹‹I have complete faith in myself. I am so sure of everything that if the same God attacks me, i would feel sorry for him... I have always been sure that I will create the art and reach the triumph; this is why i am not scare to scream out my lungs with praise to those that deserve it. If they can make art, I will also do it. If they can reach the triumph, I am also very sure that I will get there.›› We believe what he is saying. He will reach the triumph."

== Other books ==
Julio Molina Nuñez also published his original poetry in a book called “Hojas Secas” ("Dried Leaves") in 1912 and an enormous amount of essays can be found at the National Library of Chile.
