= Lesbia Harford =

Australian poet and activist

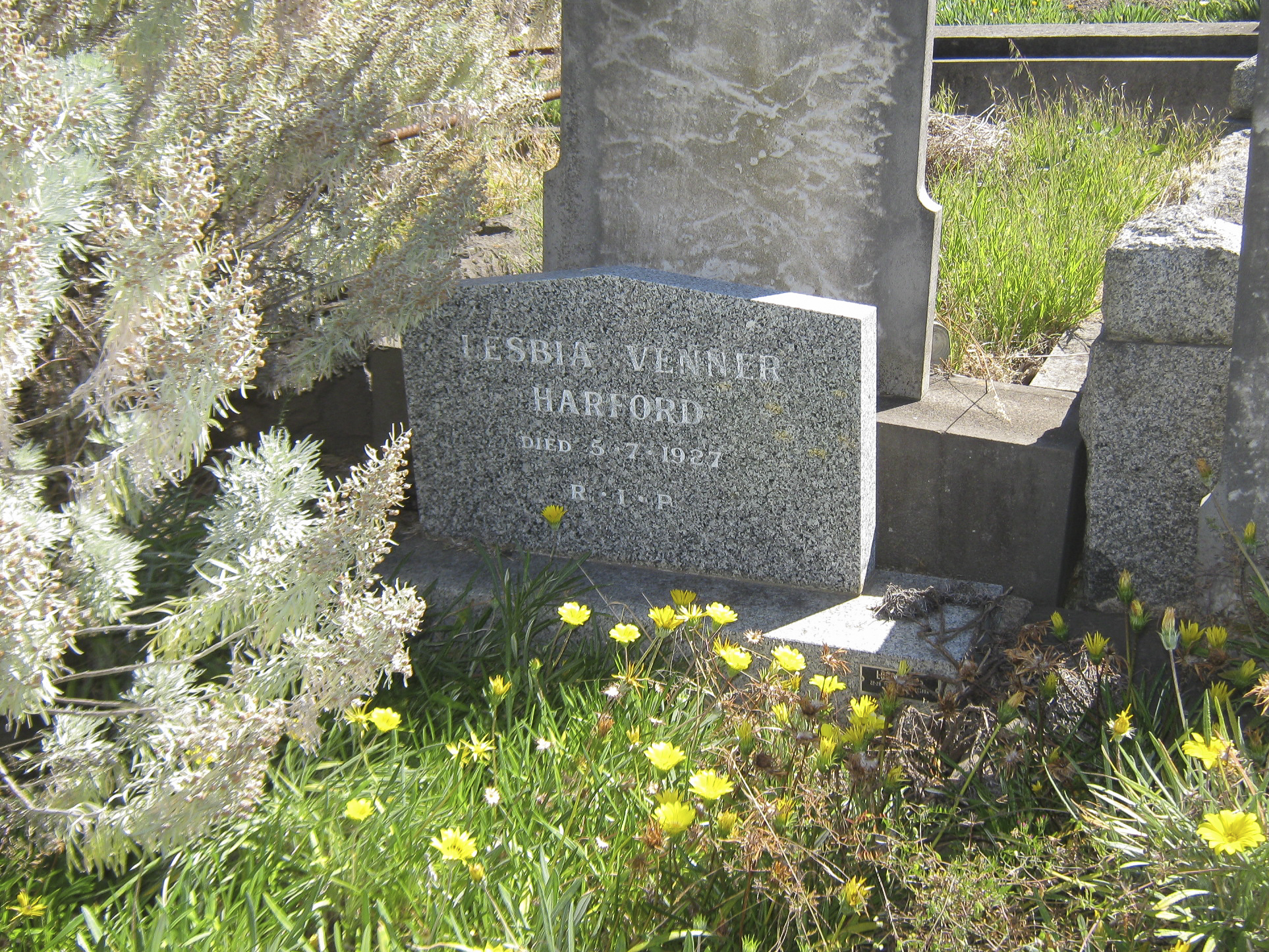
- The grave of Lesbia Harford in Kew Cemetery, Melbourne
- Born: 9 April 1891; Brighton, Victoria, Australia
- Died: 5 July 1927 (aged 36); St Vincent's Hospital, Melbourne
- Resting place: Kew Cemetery, Melbourne
- Citizenship: Australian
- Education: University of Melbourne
- Occupations: poet novelist political activist
- Spouse: Patrick John (Pat) Harford
- Parents: Edmund Joseph Keogh; Beatrice Eleanor Moore

Lesbia Venner Harford (née Keogh, 9 April 1891 – 5 July 1927) was an Australian poet, novelist and political activist. She was one of the first women to study for a law degree at the University of Melbourne. She agitated for the rights of workers, supporting a group of union workers who were imprisoned for treason and other crimes. A later reading of Harford's poetry and biography have raised her profile as a pioneer of 'free love' and a queer icon.

== Biography ==
Lesbia Venner Keogh was the first child of Edmund Joseph Keogh and Beatrice Eleanor Moore, great-great-granddaughter of an Earl of Drogheda. She was born at Brighton, Victoria, on 9 April 1891. From 1893 to 1900, the family lived at "Wangrabel", 6 Horsburgh Grove, Armadale (the house still stands today). Her father left home for Western Australia when his real estate business failed about 1900. She and her three siblings were raised by their mother, who took genteel jobs, begged handouts from Keogh relations and took in boarders.

Lesbia was one of the university's few women students and one of its few opponents of Australia's part in the First World War.

Her brother, Esmond Venner (Bill) Keogh, became a prominent medical administrator and cancer researcher. Her sister was Estelle Venner Keogh who was a recipient of the Royal Red Cross for her service as a nurse in World War I.

Harford advocated free love in human relations. She herself formed lifelong parallel attachments to both men and women, most notably to Katie Lush, philosophy tutor at Ormond College.

She became state vice-president of the Federated Clothing and Allied Trades Union. She campaigned strongly against conscription in World War I. She was a friend of Norman Jeffrey and lover of Guido Baracchi, founding members of the Communist Party of Australia (but which she never joined). In Sydney, Harford sang her poems to Guido as they crossed the harbour on the Manly ferry.

In 1918 she moved to Sydney to campaign for the release of the Sydney Twelve, members of the Industrial Workers of the World (the Wobblies) arrested and charged with treason, arson, sedition and forgery. She worked in clothing factories and as a university coach. She was also for a time a Fairfax housemaid (glimpsed in the poem "Miss Mary Fairfax"). She married Patrick John (Pat) Harford, sometime soldier, clicker in his uncle's Fitzroy boot factory and a fellow Wobbly, in 1920. They shared an interest in painting and aesthetics. He was feckless and an alcoholic but

Pat wasn't Pat last night at all.
He was the rain,—
The Spring,—
Young Dionysus, white and warm,—
Lilac and everything.

They returned to her mother's boarding house in Elsternwick, Melbourne in the early Twenties. Pat worked for the Post-Impressionist painter William Frater and himself became a painter under Frater's influence, later moving towards modernism and cubism. The Harfords had no children and were estranged in the last years of Harford's life. Some writers claim they were divorced but there is no documentary evidence of it. In 1926 Harford completed her articles with a Melbourne law firm.

Authors agree on her always-delicate health but not on the cause: rheumatic fever whilst a child (Serle); tuberculosis (Lamb); born with a heart problem that prevented her blood oxygenating (Sparrow). She often had to walk slowly. Her lips were sometimes quite blue. She died aged 36 of lung and heart failure in St Vincent's Hospital on 5 July 1927.

== Writing ==
Harford had begun writing verse in 1910.

Harford's 59-page The Law Relating to Hire Purchase in Australia and New Zealand, "just written for the money it will bring", was published in 1923.

In 1927, three of her poems were included in Serle's An Australasian Anthology. The critic H.M. Green wrote "She has written some of the best lyrics among today's and certainly, I would say, the best love lyrics written out here."

Mrs Keogh thought Harford's writing was "beautiful" and in 1939 was still trying to get her novel and more poems published.

In 1985, a much larger selection of poems appeared, edited by Marjorie Pizer and Drusilla Modjeska with a long introduction by Modjeska, acknowledging that some of Harford's sexual relations were with women and much of her love poetry was addressed to them. Les Murray published 86 of these poems and a page of biography in a 2005 anthology. Lehmann and Gray's obese 2011 Australian poetry since 1788 prints only thirteen poems (given "as much space as Brennan") but provides a scholarly and detailed critical biography.

The most recent selection in print is Collected Poems (UWAP, 2014), which has 250 poems, a two-page foreword by Les Murray and an eight-page introduction by the editor, Oliver Dennis.

Harford wrote a long-lost 190-page novel, The Invaluable Mystery, eventually published in 1987 with a foreword by Helen Garner and an introduction by Richard Nile and Robert Darby.

== Papers ==
- For decades it was thought that "On her death her father took custody of her notebooks and they were lost when his shack was destroyed by fire" but this is now known to be false. All known Harford poems are in the exercise books in Folders 1–3 of the Marjorie Pizer Papers, Mitchell Library, NSW, MLMSS 7428. Another ten folders collect manuscripts, typescript, letters and photos relating mainly to publication of her work.
- The typescript of The Invaluable Mystery is in the National Archive of Australia, Canberra, Series A699, control 1958/3640, barcode 278433.

== Legacy ==
The political rock band Redgum recorded part of Harford's poem "Periodicity" set to music as "Women in Change" on their 1980 album Virgin Ground.

In Melbourne, the Victorian Women Lawyers' biennial Lesbia Harford Oration, given by an eminent speaker on an issue of importance for women, is named in her honour.

In 1991, the Playbox Theatre Company Melbourne presented Earthly Paradise; a Picture of Lesbia Harford, by the playwright Darryl Emmerson. This play was also published by Currency Press, Sydney.

== Bibliography ==
=== Novel ===
- The Invaluable Mystery (1987)

=== Poetry collections ===
- The Poems of Lesbia Harford (1941)
- The Poems of Lesbia Harford edited by Drusilla Modjeska and Marjorie Pizer (1985)
- Collected Poems : Lesbia Harford (2014)
- Selected Poems (2023)

=== Selected list of poems ===
Title	Year	First published	Reprinted/collected in
"I'm Like All Lovers"	1917		The Poems of Lesbia Harford, Angus and Robertson, 1985, pp. 88–89
