= The Sentimental Bloke (disambiguation) =

The Sentimental Bloke is a 1918 Australian silent film.

The Sentimental Bloke may also refer to:

- The Sentimental Bloke (1932 film), an Australian film
- The Sentimental Bloke (1961 musical), by Albert Arlen, Nancy Brown and Lloyd Thomson
- The Sentimental Bloke (1963 film), a half-hour ballet
- The Sentimental Bloke (1985 musical), by George Dreyfus and Graeme Blundell
