= The Glugs of Gosh =

Poetry collection by C. J. Dennis

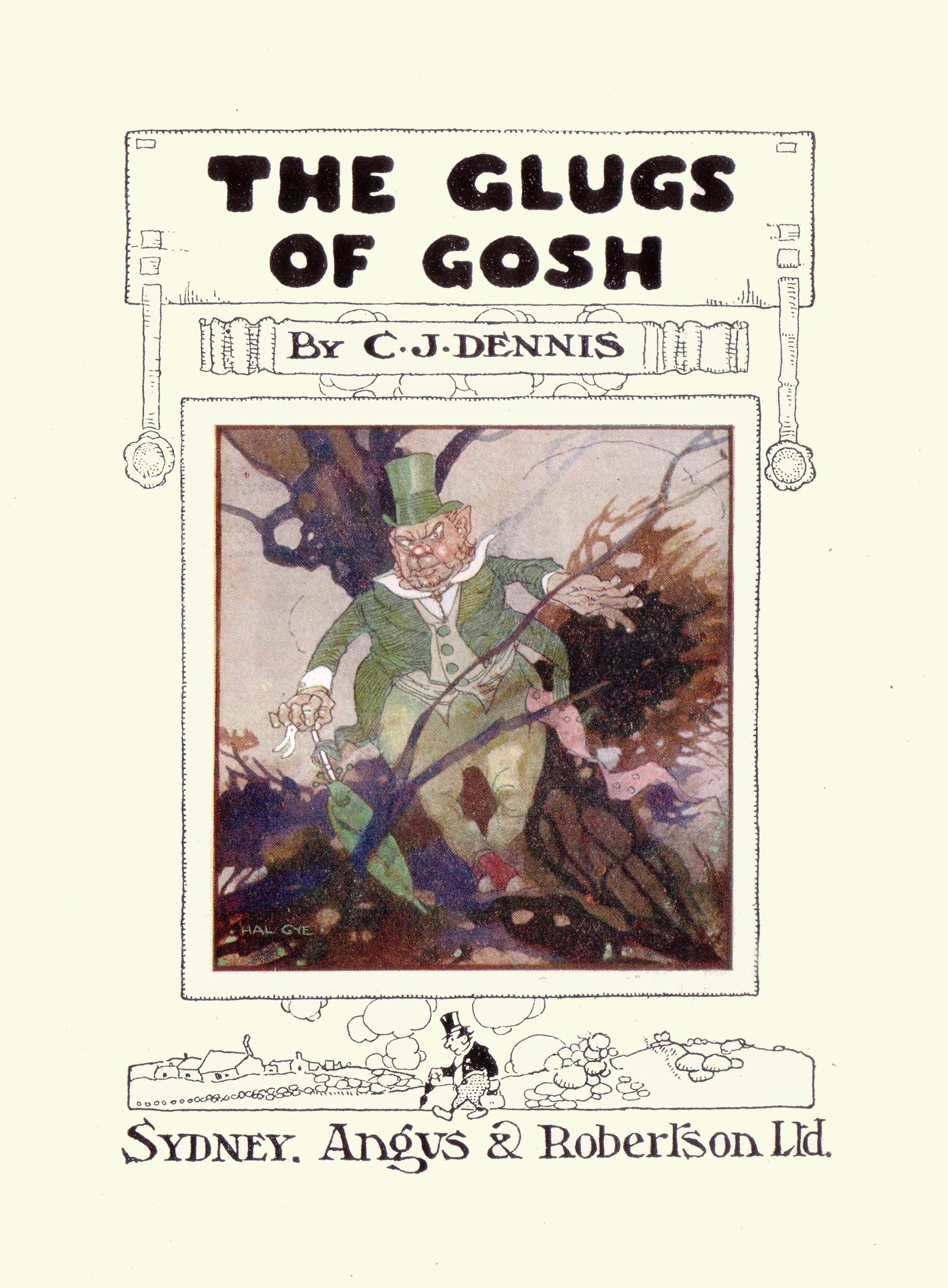
- Author: C. J. Dennis
- Illustrator: Hal Gye
- Cover artist: Hal Gye
- Language: English
- Genre: Satire
- Set in: Gosh
- Publisher: Angus & Robertson
- Publication date: 1917
- Publication place: Australia
- Pages: 130
- Preceded by: The Moods of Ginger Mick
- Followed by: Doreen
- Text: The Glugs of Gosh at Wikisource

The Glugs of Gosh is a book of satirical verse written by Australian author C. J. Dennis, published by Angus & Robertson in 1917. The book's 13 poems are vignettes of life in a fictional kingdom called Gosh, inhabited by an arboreal race (that is to say, climbers) known as Glugs. Dennis describes the Glugs as a "stupid race of docile folk". The illustrations, by Dennis's regular collaborator Hal Gye, depict the Glugs as short humanoids with large heads. Written in the style of children's nonsense poetry, the work attacks free trade, along with what Dennis saw as Australia's social conformity, intellectual cowardice and rampant bureaucracy. Although the book has greater literary merit than the larrikin-inspired doggerel verse for which Dennis is famed, it was a commercial failure. According to one biographer, "the veiled political and economic satirical verse was lost on the public." The book is dedicated to his wife.

== Background ==
Dennis wrote the poem "Joi, the Glug" for the youngest son of his friend and patron Garry Roberts, presenting it in June 1914. Developing the idea further, he published seven Glug poems in the Bulletin magazine, starting with "Joi, the Glug" on 3 June 1915. Following the success of The Songs of a Sentimental Bloke in 1915, publisher Angus & Robertson commissioned Dennis to expand the poems into a book.

The work became a platform for Dennis's political views, notably protectionism, pacifism and republicanism. Drawing on his unhappy experiences working in the federal Attorney-General's Department, he devoted much of the text to lampooning the growth of bureaucracy. So trenchant is the author's critique that, McQueen observes, "only his public reputation as a patriotic versifier enabled Dennis's anti-war republicanism to pass unnoticed" by the wartime censors.

== Structure and content ==
The book is made up of 13 poems:

1. The Glug Quest
2. Joi, the Glug
3. The Stones of Gosh
4. Sym, the Son of Joi
5. The Growth of Sym
6. The End of Joi
7. The Swanks of Gosh
8. The Seer
9. The Rhymes of Sym
10. The Debate
11. Ogs
12. Emily Ann
13. The Little Red Dog.

The poems are connected by references to the recurring characters of Joi, an iconoclastic advocate of protectionism and import substitution; and his son Sym, a tramp, tinker and reclusive poet loosely modelled on Dennis himself. The book tells of a small constitutional monarchy under King Splosh I, whose government is led by Stodge, the "Lord High Swank". The character of Stodge is an amalgam of three of Australia's founding fathers, Alfred Deakin, Sir John Forrest and Sir George Reid. Stodge's administration is composed of other "swanks":

In Gosh, sad Gosh, where the Lord Swank lives,
He holds high rank, and he has much pelf;
And all the well-paid posts he gives
Unto his fawning relatives,
As foolish as himself.

Together with Splosh, Stodge promotes free trade with Gosh's neighbours and sometime enemies, the Ogs of Podge. In return, Gosh exports the entirety of its principal natural resource, stones.

So the Glugs continued, with greed and glee,
To buy cheap clothing, and pills, and tea;
Till every Glug in the land of Gosh
Owned three clean shirts and a fourth in the wash.
But they all grew idle, and fond of ease,
And easy to swindle, and hard to please;

Joi is hanged, but later vindicated: Gosh experiences a balance of payments crisis and ultimately an inconclusive war with Podge. Chastened at having become victims of their own exported stones, the Glugs invite Sym to take over from Stodge. But he declines the appointment, like Dennis preferring a quiet married life in the countryside.

"Kettles and pots! Kettles and pans!
Strong is my arm if the cause it be man's.
But a fig for the cause of a cunning old king;
For Emily Ann will be mine in the Spring.
Then nought shall I labour for Splosh or his plans;
Tho' I'll mend him a kettle. Ho, kettles and pans!"

== Reception and legacy ==
The book is not without its critics. One biographer considered that, despite "considerable promise", "the narrative gets bogged down in a complicated plot and loses its satirical focus." Some reviewers of the time considered that the "shallow and pretentious" narrative "labours the obvious"; others found its "humorous and lyrical dexterity" to be "amusing and intelligent".

Though the poetry retains the romanticism of the bush ballads, in moving from the celebration of Australian larrikinism to pointed social and political criticism, Dennis confounded his readers' expectations. McQueen writes:

The picture of the typical Australian to emerge from The Glugs totally contradicts the one popularly taken from The Bloke and Ginger Mick, where we are independent, resourceful, haters of authority and good mates. By contrast, Glugs are bound together by mindless conformism; they anticipate A. F. Davies' view that, above all, "Australians have a characteristíc talent for bureaucracy".

Thus the work, which Dennis considered to be his best, never won the popularity or influence of Songs of a Sentimental Bloke. Nevertheless, commentators occasionally note the continued relevance of his words to debates over trade policy and foreign investment.

The book was reprinted in 1918, 1919 and 1980. Dennis wrote one further poem about Glugs, The Griefs of Ancient Gosh, in 1935. Two of the original poems were republished in 1974 as a children's book, also called The Glugs of Gosh.

== See also ==
- Military history of Australia during World War I
- 1938 Dalfram dispute
- Australia–China relations
