= The Sentimental Bloke (1961 musical) =

- Original cast album
- Music: Albert Arlen
- Lyrics: Albert Arlen, Nancy Brown, C.J. Dennis & Lloyd Thomson
- Book: Lloyd Thomson & Nancy Brown
- Basis: The Songs of a Sentimental Bloke by C.J. Dennis
- Productions: 1961 Melbourne; 1983 Penrith; 1988 Parramatta

The Sentimental Bloke is a 1961 Australian musical by Albert Arlen, Nancy Brown and Lloyd Thomson based on Songs of a Sentimental Bloke by C.J. Dennis. Set in Melbourne, it is one of the most successful Australian musicals of the 20th century.

The musical has also been adapted for television and ballet.

== Development ==
Albert Arlen and Nancy Brown had worked on the musical since 1950.

Initially they sought the involvement of George Johnston, and it was announced in 1951 when Arlen arrived back in Australia from London that Johnston was working on the book.

Later, the actor Lloyd Thomson was brought on board as writer.

Arlen and Brown went to England in 1955 to promote the show. This was unsuccessful so they returned to Australia.

In 1957 J.C. Williamson's took an option on the show.

The writers borrowed some money, and self-produced the musical in an amateur production at Canberra's Albert Hall in March 1961. The cast included Edwin Ride and Brown. The one-week run in Canberra was so popular that extra seating in the aisles had to be arranged. J. C. Williamson's directors Sir Frank Tait and John McCallum attended the final performance.

== Productions ==
=== Original production ===
Later that year, J. C. Williamson's produced the musical professionally in Melbourne. The original six-week season at Melbourne's Comedy Theatre (from 4 November 1961), directed by John Young, was later extended to five months. The Bloke, Doreen and Rose of Spadger's Lane were played by Edwin Ride (from the amateur Canberra production), Patsy Hemingway and Gloria Dawn respectively.

Through 1962, the production toured to Adelaide (Tivoli Theatre), Brisbane (Her Majesty's Theatre), Sydney (Theatre Royal) and Auckland, New Zealand (His Majesty's Theatre).

The Bulletin said "John Young's production has only one serious fault: It is too long and too loose. But that can be remedied very easily by some simple tailoring."

=== Revivals ===
The Sentimental Bloke was revived professionally by Penrith's Q Theatre Company in April–May 1983, directed by Doreen Warburton. A subsequent professional production was staged by the Parramatta Cultural Centre and Q Theatre Company in March–April 1988, also directed by Warburton. Amateur theatre groups in Australia often perform the musical. Neglected Musicals revived the show in a professional, semi-staged read through at Hayes Theatre, Sydney in October 2019.

== Recordings ==
A live cast recording was made during a Melbourne performance, released by Talent City in 1962.

The Australian Broadcasting Commission made a studio cast recording in 1967 featuring Neil Williams, Janet Crawford, Jimmy Hannan and Jill Perryman. Songs from the musical have been featured on various other recordings.

== 1976 TV version ==
The Sentimental Bloke
- Written by: Alan Burke
- Directed by: Alan Burke
- Starring: Graeme Blundell; Geraldine Turner; Jimmy Hannan; Nancye Hayes
- Country of origin: Australia
- Original language: English

Production
- Producer: Michael Shrimpton

Original release
- Network: ABC
- Release: 10 July 1976 (Melbourne)
- Release: 17 July 1976 (Sydney)

The musical was filmed for ABC TV in 1976. The television adaptation was written and directed by Alan Burke and featured Graeme Blundell as Bill and Geraldine Turner as Doreen.

=== Cast ===
- Graeme Blundell as The Bloke
- Geraldine Turner as Doreen
- Jimmy Hannan as Ginger Mick
- Nancye Hayes as Rose
- Jon Finlayson as Mr Smithers
- Anne Phelan as Mabel
- Laine Lamont as Gertie
- Joy
- Jon Fabian as Chorus

=== Production ===
A decision was taken that the whole thing should be very stylised in form. "Dennis certainly drew a picture of the life of the poor but he was interested in the warmth, the humour - there's no real social statement," said Burke. "And I decided it wouldn't be appropriate to try for real, down-at-heel neighbourhood settings, especially in this musical adaptation."

== Ballet ==
The Australian Ballet developed a ballet version of The Sentimental Bloke choreographed by Robert Ray, with Arlen's music freely arranged by John Lanchbery. The Australian Ballet first presented this in 1985 in Australia, and subsequently on its tour of the Soviet Union.

== Other versions ==
A second musical theatre adaptation of The Sentimental Bloke, not related to the Arlen, Brown and Thomson version, was written by Graeme Blundell with music by George Dreyfus. It was premiered by the Melbourne Theatre Company at the Playhouse, Victorian Arts Centre on 12 December 1985, with John Jarrett in the starring role. This production, hosted by The Melbourne Theatre Company, offered its first Auslan interpreted performance on 18 December 1985.
