= Albert Arlen =

- Born: Albert Aarons; 10 January 1905; Sydney, Australia
- Died: 24 March 1993 (aged 88) Sunshine Coast, Queensland, Australia
- Genres: musicals
- Occupations: pianist, composer, actor and playwright
- Years active: 1930s – 1960s

Albert Arlen AM (10 January 1905 – 24 March 1993) was a Turkish Australian pianist, composer, actor and playwright. He is best known for his musical The Sentimental Bloke (to the poetry of C. J. Dennis), the "Alamein Concerto", and his setting of Banjo Paterson's Clancy of the Overflow.

== Biography ==
Albert Aarons was born in Sydney in 1905 to Turkish immigrants. He was educated at Cleveland Street Public School and Crown Street High School. He studied at the New South Wales State Conservatorium (graduated in 1924) and the École Normale de Musique de Paris. He then worked in London where he played various roles in West End repertory productions, as well as writing his own musical compositions and plays such as The Son of the Grand Eunuch (January 1937). He was known professionally as Albert Arlen and legally changed his name in 1948.

In 1939, he joined the Royal Air Force as a pilot's assistant, serving in the Middle and Far East. These experiences inspired a concerto for piano and orchestra, which he called the "Alamein Concerto". This was first performed in Cairo in 1944, with pianist Phil Finch and conductor Hugo Rignold. It was recorded by Monia Liter with the Mantovani Orchestra. Pathé used the music in their documentary on the anniversary of the Battle of El Alamein. After the war Arlen was sent to Singapore, and wrote musical revues which were seen in Singapore, Hong Kong, Malaya and Ceylon.

Albert Arlen married actress, singer and playwright Nancy Brown in 1949. Nancy was born in Brisbane in 1909 and moved to England at the age of 14, after her parents' divorce. She appeared in such musicals as Old Chelsea with Richard Tauber.

=== The Sentimental Bloke ===
Albert and Nancy returned to Australia, living in Canberra. Together, they started writing The Sentimental Bloke around 1950, to C. J. Dennis's The Songs of a Sentimental Bloke. Initially they sought the involvement of George Johnston, who showed little interest. Later, the actor Lloyd Thomson was brought on board as writer. Albert and Nancy went to England in 1955 to promote the show. This was unsuccessful so they returned to Australia, borrowed some money, put together an amateur cast, and staged the show themselves in March 1961 in the Albert Hall in Canberra. (A ballet with the same name, choreographed by Lauren Martyn with music by John Tallis had premiered in Melbourne in 1952. This was withdrawn shortly after its premiere since Albert Arlen owned the rights to stage representations of Dennis's works.) The show had a one-week run in Canberra, which was so popular that extra seating in the aisles had to be arranged. J. C. Williamson's directors Sir Frank Tait and John McCallum attended the final performance and decided to sponsor it for a further six-week season at the Comedy Theatre in Melbourne (from 4 November 1961), directed by John Young. This was later extended to five months. The roles of The Bloke, Doreen and Rose of Spadger's Lane were played by Edwin Ride, Patsy Hemingway and Gloria Dawn respectively. It eventually ran for over a year in Adelaide, Brisbane, Sydney and New Zealand. The show was turned into another ballet, with Arlen's music freely arranged by John Lanchbery and choreography by Robert Ray, which the Australian Ballet staged in 1985 in Australia, and presented on their tour of the Soviet Union.

The Girl from the Snowy (Riverside Theatre, Canberra, 17 March 1960) and Marriages Are Made in Heaven, two other musicals, failed to have the success of The Sentimental Bloke. Arlen also wrote some songs and piano pieces.

The songs Clancy of the Overflow and The Rivetter were recorded by Peter Dawson, the former in a best-selling recording made on 4 May 1955, accompanied by the London Symphony Orchestra conducted by Charles Mackerras.

In 1991 Nancy Brown Arlen published her autobiography "The Black Sheep of the Brown family: A Magic Life!".

Albert Arlen died on the Sunshine Coast, Queensland, in 1993.

== Honours and awards ==
For his "service to music and the performing arts," Albert Arlen was appointed a Member of the Order of Australia in January 1990.

== List of works ==
- "Alamein Concerto" (piano and orchestra, 1944)
- "Ballad for Australians" (words Arlen and John Barnes)
- "The Austr-laise (fellers of Australia)" (vocal march for military band, c. 1961)
- "Bring back the Simple Faith" (song; lyrics by Harold Simpson, 1937)
- "A Celtic Romance" (c. 1965)
- "Clancy of the Overflow" (1948)
- "Elise-oh! Go-go! (with apologies to Beethoven)" (c. 1966)
- "The Girl from the Snowy" (musical; lyrics by Arlen; c. 1960)
- "Go to sleep, little baby" (waltz lullaby, words John Wheeler, c. 1948)
- "God remembers every-thing" (words Kathleen Egan; c. 1935)
- "I heard a blackbird in a tree" (words Bruce Sievier; 1935)
- "Many things I have loved" (words Arlen; c. 1965)
- "Marriages are Made in Heaven" (musical)
- "My life is a love song" (words Bruce Sievier; 1936)
- "Night club: an atmospheric impression" (piano; c. 1946)
- "The Pagoda of Jade" suite (orchestrated by Denis Wright)
- "Requiem for a Siamese Cat: inspired by the poem of the same name" (piano; 1965)
- "The Rivetter" (song; baritone and orchestra; words Bruce Sievier; c. 1937)
- The Sentimental Bloke (based on the poems of C. J. Dennis; book by Nancy Brown and Lloyd Thomson; lyrics by Nancy Brown, Albert Arlen, Lloyd Thomson and C.J. Dennis; music by Albert Arlen. 1961)
- "Song of Canberra"
- "The Song of England" (soprano, chorus and orchestra)
- "Spinnakers: a sketch of Sydney Harbour" (piano; 1970)
- "Suzette, my dolly, and me" (words Harry Hemsley; c. 1938)
- "Your Voice"

== See also ==
- The Sentimental Bloke – the 1919 silent film, based on the same poem

== Sources ==
- Music Australia
