= Doreen (book) =

1917 verse novel by C. J. Dennis

- Author: C. J. Dennis
- Language: English
- Genre: Verse novel
- Publisher: Angus and Robertson
- Publication date: 1917
- Publication place: Australia
- Media type: Print
- Pages: 23 pp
- Preceded by: The Moods of Ginger Mick
- Text: Doreen at Wikisource

Doreen is a verse novel by Australian poet and journalist C. J. Dennis, published by Angus and Robertson, in 1917. The collection includes two illustrated plates by Hal Gye.

The novel is a sequel to the poet's The Songs of a Sentimental Bloke and The Moods of Ginger Mick, and tells the story of Bill (the Sentimental Bloke) and his wife Doreen during their married years. The character of Doreen was first introduced in Dennis's poem The Intro, the second in the author's collection The Songs of a Sentimental Bloke.

'ER name's Doreen… Well, spare me bloomin' days!
You could 'a' knocked me down wiv 'arf a brick!
Yes, me, that kids me self I know their ways,
An' 'as a name fer smoogin' in our click!
I jist lines up an' tips the saucy wink.
But strike! The way she piled on dawg! Yeh'd think
A bloke wus givin' back-chat to the Queen….
'Er name's Doreen.

All of the four poems included were published here for the first time.

== Contents ==
- "Washing Day"
- "Logic and Spotted Dog"
- "Vi'lits"
- "Possum"

== Critical reception ==
A reviewer in The Bulletin was rather uncomplimentary in his note: "It is all very pleasant, but one feels that now C. J. Dennis could write these sentimental yarns in his sleep—and that he's getting tired of sentimental slang. Still, there is a big Australian public that isn't."

With a contrary opinion the reviewer in The Queenslander was rather more welcoming: "Welcome, Doreen ! We have been waiting for you. And here she is, in a pretty tinted dress, with envelope to match, ready for presentation to friends...Homely subjects, but treated with rare insight and humour. The world will clamour for more about Doreen."

== Publication history ==
After the initial publication of the collection by Angus and Robertson in 1917, it was reissued as follows:

- S. B. Gundy, Canada and John Lane Co, USA, 1917,
- Angus and Robertson, Australia, 1981

== Note ==
The first edition of the book was advertised as a "Christmas booklet" and "A Christmas Story in Verse" despite there being no reference to the Christmas season in the four poems.

== See also ==
- Doreen 1917 Booklet
- 1917 in Australian literature
- "Chapter 9: The Glugs of Gosh, 1917" in An Unsentimental Bloke: The Life and Work of C. J. Dennis by Philip Butterss
