= Harold Frederick Neville Gye =

Australian cartoonist and author (1887–1967)

Hal Gye
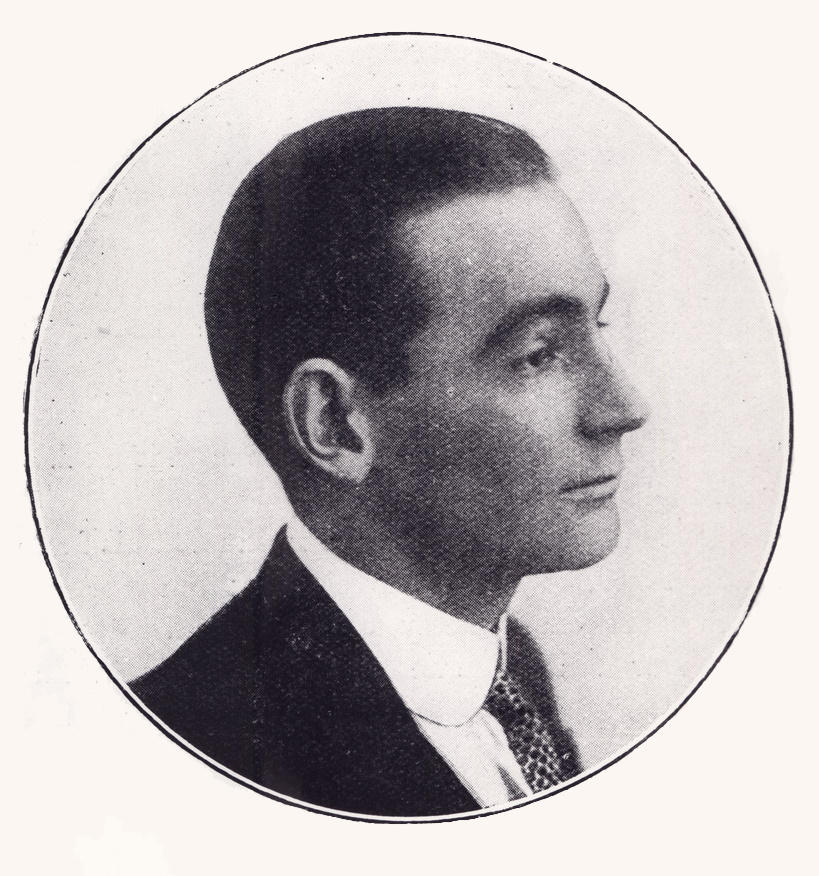
- Gye, photographed c. 1920
- Born: Harold Frederick Neville Gye; 22 May 1887; Ryde, New South Wales
- Died: 25 November 1967 (aged 80); Beaumaris, Victoria
- Occupations: Artist, cartoonist, caricaturist, illustrator, graphic designer, writer
- Writing career
- Pen name: James Hackston, Hacko

Harold Frederick Neville Gye (22 May 1887 — 25 November 1967), was a prolific Australian artist, cartoonist and caricaturist under the name Hal Gye and a writer of verse and short stories under James Hackston. Gye's artwork was published in a number of newspapers and magazines including The Bulletin, a journal with which he had a long association both as an artist and a writer. Gye was also a noted book illustrator. His artwork was featured in the books of C. J. Dennis beginning with The Songs of a Sentimental Bloke in 1915 and he also illustrated books of verse by Will H. Ogilvie and Banjo Paterson. As 'James Hackston' Gye wrote verse and autobiographical short stories published in The Bulletin and the Coast to Coast series of anthologies. In 1966 his collected short stories were published as Father Clears Out.

== Biography ==
=== Early years ===
Harold Frederick Neville Gye was born in the Sydney suburb of Ryde on 22 May 1887, the son of Walter Neville Gye and Priscilla (née Warr). His father was a builder, originally from London.^{[A]} Later in 1888 Walter Gye took his family to the Black Range goldfield to the north of Albury near the Victorian border where he took up land and prospected for gold. Young Harold was educated in the local bush school until the age of twelve. In about 1899 his family moved to Melbourne.

For about two years Gye worked in a architect’s office in Melbourne, after which he worked as a law clerk. Gye was an avid reader of books on drawing and joined an art class conducted by Alek Sass. He became a member of the Melbourne bohemian group which met at the Mitre Hotel in Bank Place and Fasoli's Cafe in Lonsdale Street. While he was employed as a law clerk, Gye began to have his artistic and literary work published, including a political cartoon accepted for publication by The Bulletin, featuring the Australian prime minister George Reid. During 1906 Gye had several of his cartoons published in The Gadfly, founded in Adelaide by C. J. Dennis. His illustration, 'Prince's Bridge at Night', was published in the December 1907 edition of The Native Companion. Later that month the Sydney-based Bulletin magazine published verse written by Gye, titled 'Mrs. Melba's Motor Car'.

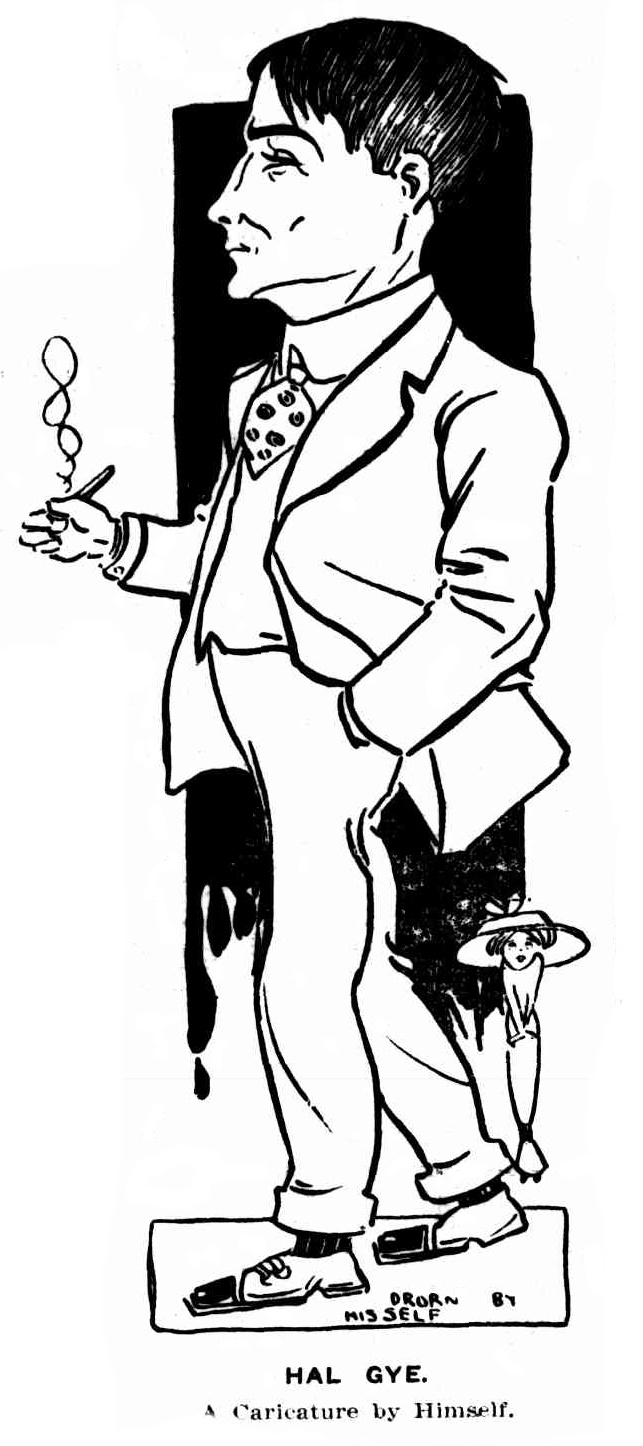
'Drorn by Hisself', a caricature of Hal Gye by Hal Gye, published in The Worker (Wagga Wagga), 29 September 1910.

=== An artistic and literary career ===
In March 1908 it was reported that Hal Gye had abandoned his career as a law clerk pursuing legal studies in favour of drawing and writing professionally. His first acceptance as a freelance artist was a drawing he sold for two shillings and sixpence to Melbourne's weekly Table Talk magazine.

Gye shared a studio with Alex Sass and Harry Weston. On Sundays he inked-in sections of the full-page drawings Sass was producing each week for Melbourne's weekly Punch magazine. During this period Gye also inked-in some of Ambrose Dyson's cartoons for the Pastoral Review, "when Dyson's hand was too shaky for the task".

Gye contributed several cartoons to Vumps, "a profusely-illustrated sixteen-page penny 'comic'", published in Sydney in August 1908. Vumps (subtitled "Pure Australian Fun") was Australia's first comic book, promoted as a rival to the English 'boys own' comics. However, the Australian publication did not survive beyond its first issue.^{[B]}

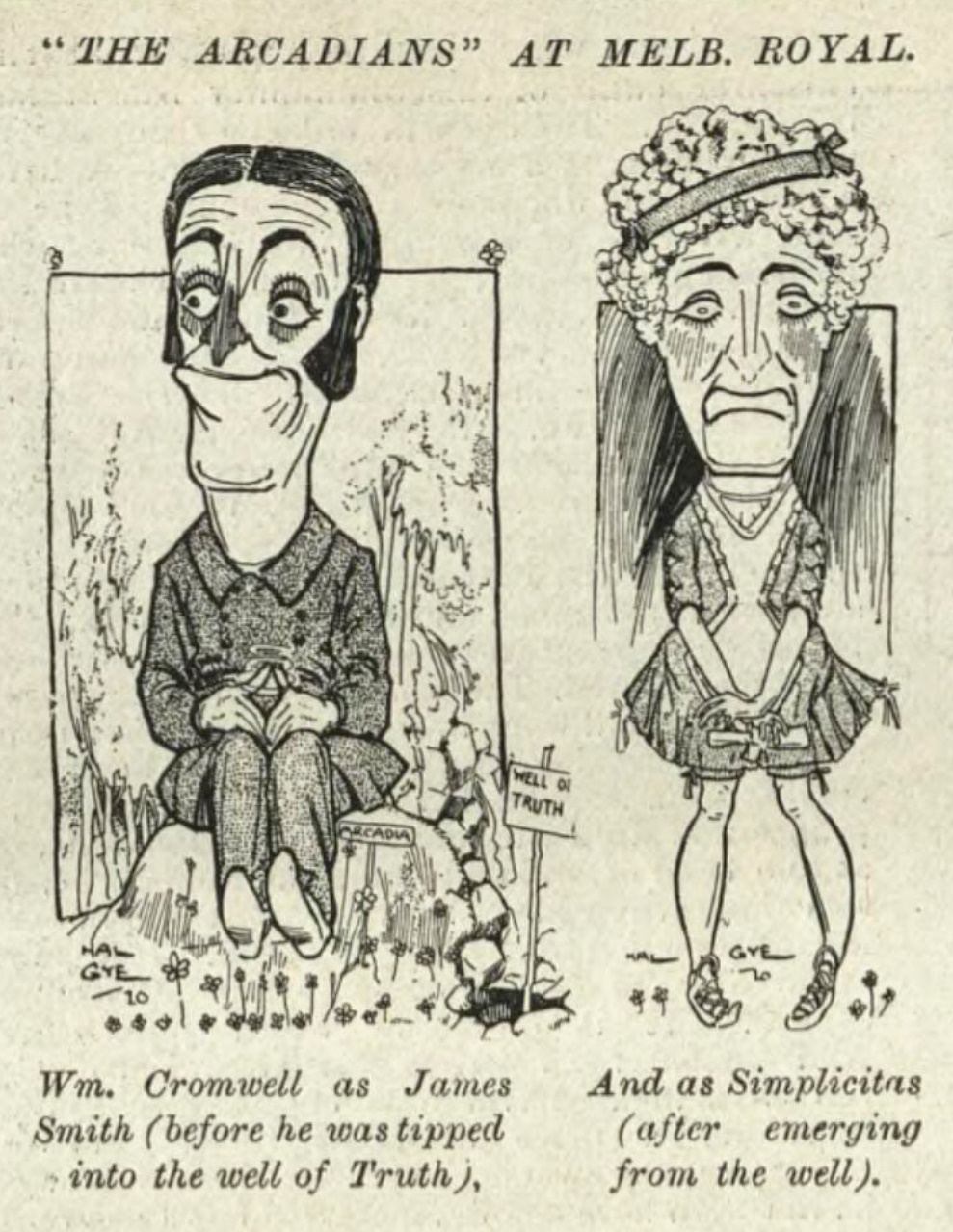
'"The Arcadians" at Melb. Royal' (The Bulletin, 31 March 1910).

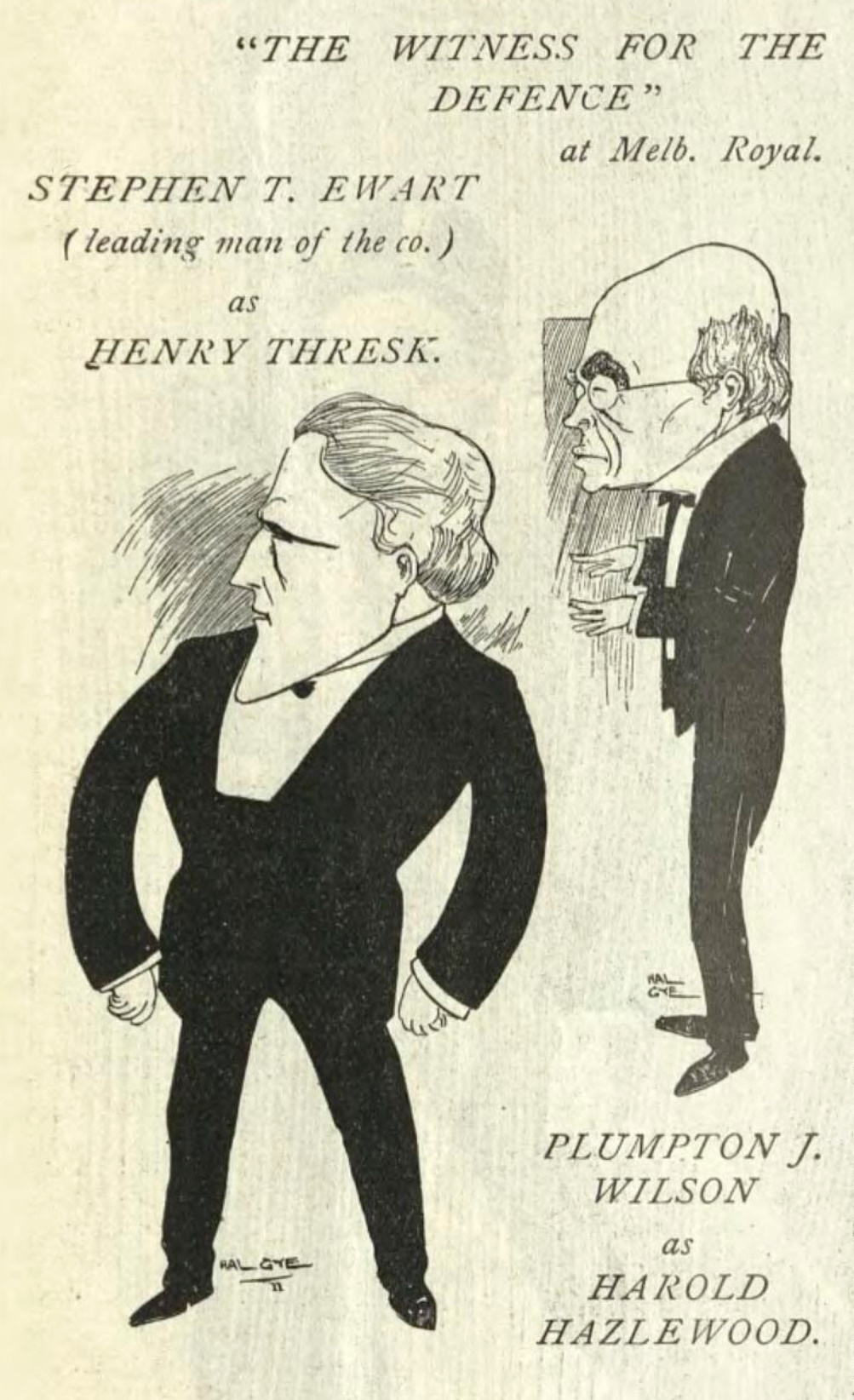
The actors Stephen Ewart and Plumpton Wilson (The Bulletin, 20 July 1911).

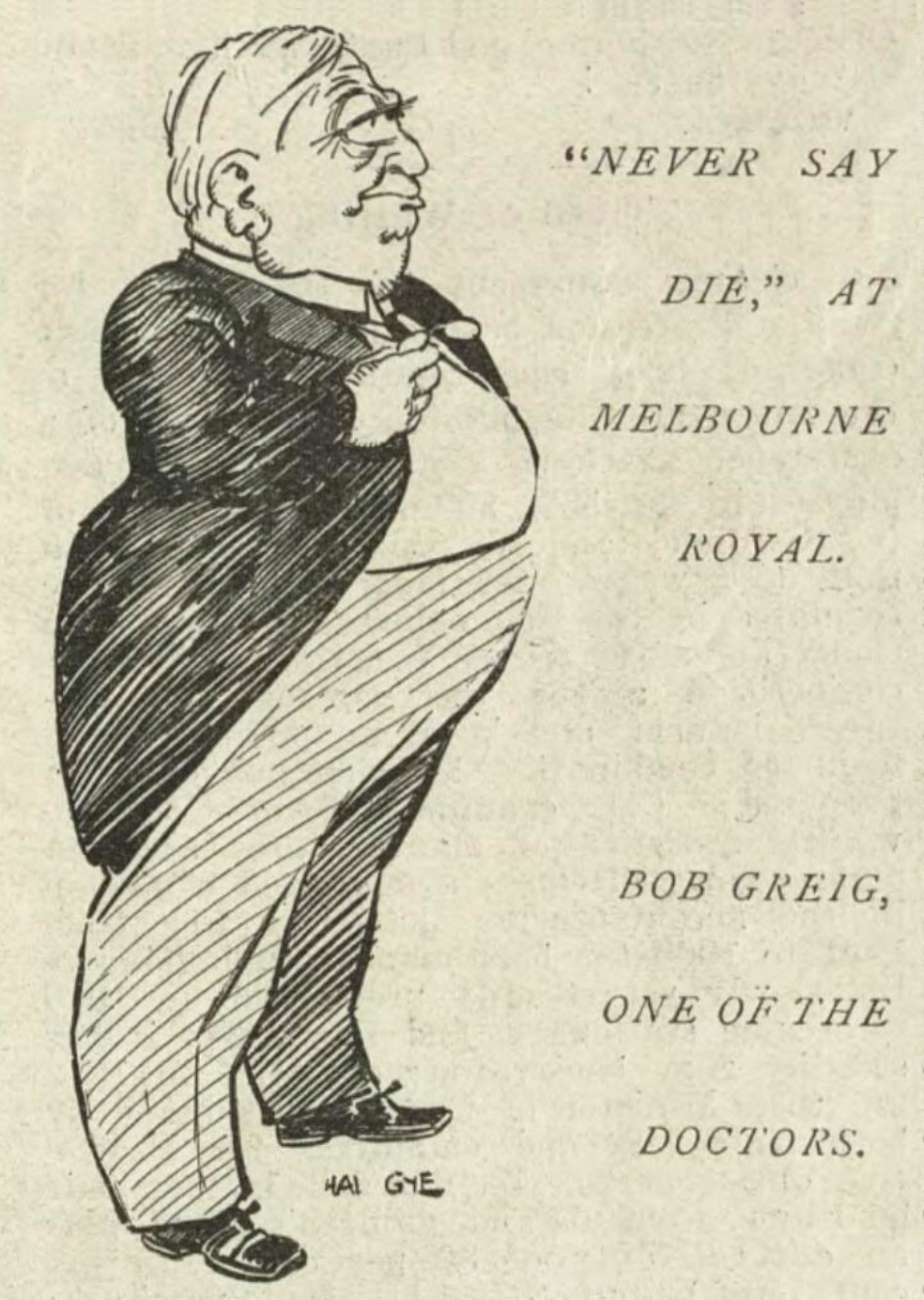
Caricature of the actor Bob Greig (The Bulletin, 18 June 1914).

A selection Melbourne theatrical caricatures by Hal Gye.

In 1909 Gye provided illustrations for a booklet written by Ambrose Pratt called The History of Aviation. The publication outlined "the problem of human flight... from its legendary stage until its successful achievement in the present century".

After Will Dyson left for England in October 1909, Gye was invited to contribute theatrical caricatures from Melbourne to The Bulletin. Gye's caricatures and political and humorous cartoons continued to be occasionally published in The Bulletin into the 1920s. Gye contributed writings as well as images and was considered to be "one of The Bulletin's best all-round contributors". In addition to his caricatures and cartoons he had verse published in The Bulletin, wrote material for the 'Red Page' and leader-page, reported on boxing matches and contributed "a fair amount of writing" for the 'Poverty Point' section of the magazine.

In September 1910 Gye was employed as an artist for The Vanguard, a daily newspaper published by the Victorian branch of the Australian Labor Party. At about that time he was also contributing works to other publications (in addition to The Bulletin), contributing caricatures of politicians to Melbourne Punch, as well as of sporting people for the Judge. His cartoons were also published in The Worker newspaper, published in Wagga Wagga.

In 1911 Gye was one of seven artists who contributed illustrations to a publication commemorating an incident in the Second Boer War in February 1900 when members of the Victorian Mounted Rifles were part of a force covering the retreat of the Wiltshire Regiment by holding a kopje named Pink Hill, west of Rensburg, against overwhelming odds. The Victorian casualties were the first of the war.

From about 1912 Gye shared a studio with the cartoonist David Low in Collins Street, Melbourne. Low left Australia for England in 1919.

In 1913 Gye collaborated with the journalist T. M. Hogan in a book about Tasmania titled The Tight Little Island, described as "a panorama of the authors' peregrinations and reflections". In a review published in Hobart's Critic newspaper, Gye's illustrations for the publication were described as "quaint and humorous".

Gye was one of four artists who held an exhibition at the Athenaeum Galleries in Melbourne in August 1914. The other artists represented were Percy Lindsay, G. Courtney Benson and R. H. Stockfeld. A review of the exhibition commented that Gye "enjoys the somewhat doubtful felicity of being an expert caricaturist" who "handles his pen with a facile and acceptable directness". Gye's contributions included thirty caricatures, as well as "more orthodox" works showing "the possession of a poetic sense".

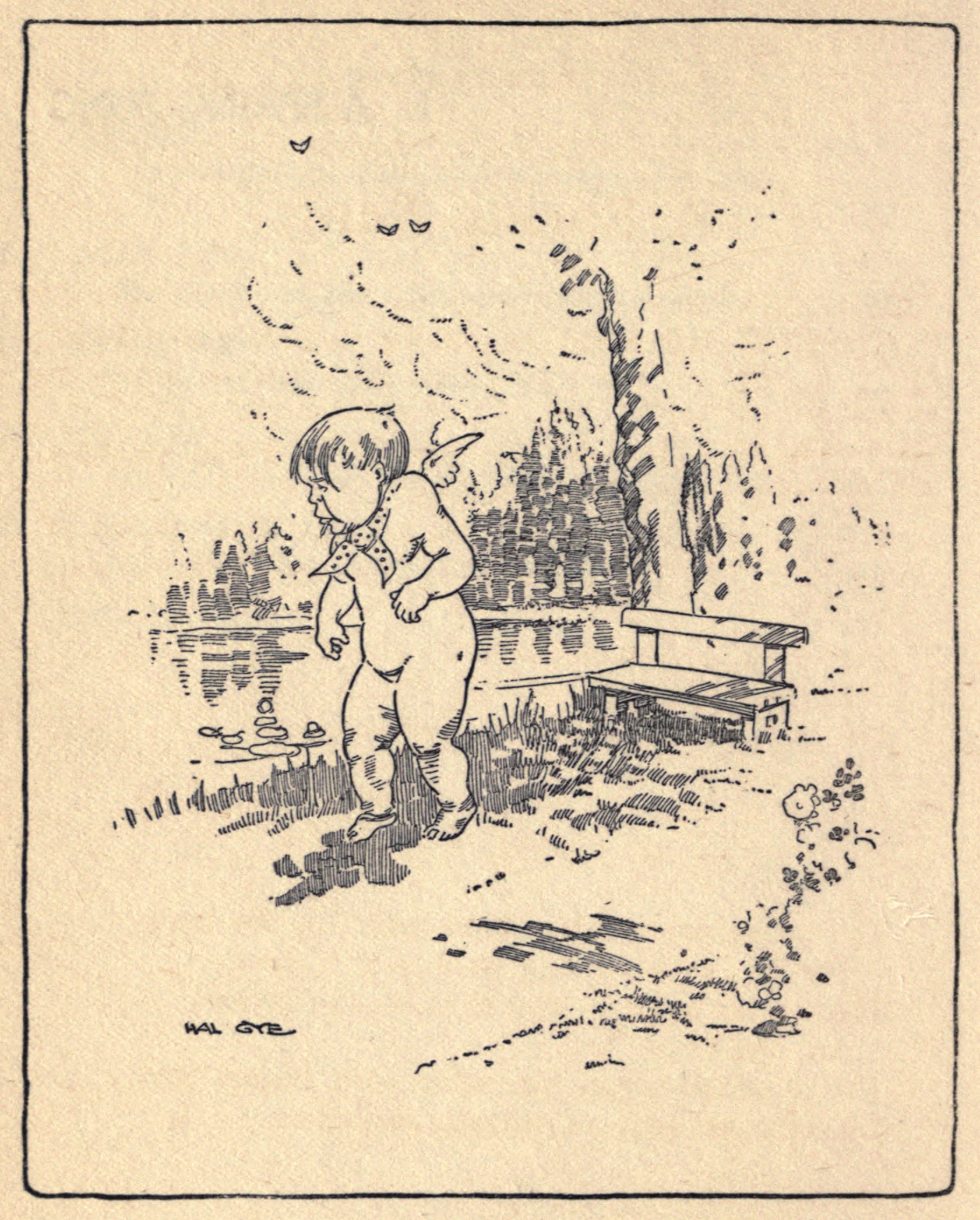
One of Gye's illustrations from The Songs of a Sentimental Bloke.

After C. J. Dennis had completed the writing of The Songs of a Sentimental Bloke, he chose Hal Gye "to do the quaint illustrations" the author had in mind. They met at Gye's studio and "planned an elaborate 'make-up'" of the book, including the title-page and dust-jacket. The illustrations produced by Gye for The Sentimental Bloke highlight the romantic qualities of the text, portraying the uncultivated 'larrikin' Bill as a whimsical cupid-figure, "complete with chubby thighs and stubbily diaphanous wings". The book, published by Angus & Robertson in Sydney and with a dust-jacket featuring Gye's artwork, was released in October 1915.

In 1916 Gye married Alice Gifford, a chorus girl for the J. C. Williamson theatrical company. The couple were married at Flemington on 15 November 1916 in the Methodist church.

Gye provided illustrations for an anthology of Scottish Border poet and Australian bush balladeer Will H. Ogilvie, with The Australian and other verses (1916) frontispiece and title page. Work was also undertaken for poet and writer Andrew Barton 'Banjo' Paterson. Gye provided the illustrations for Dennis' book of satirical verse The Glugs of Gosh, published in 1917.

During the period 1915 to 1918 Gye's illustrations were featured in short stories published in the Weekly Times Annual. In 1918 Gye extended the concept of his popular cupid illustrations from The Sentimental Bloke. A full-page cartoon called 'Cupid Up to Date' was published in the Weekly Times Annual, depicting Cupid's courtship and marriage, his war service and eventual wounding and his return to Australia to his wife and newborn son.

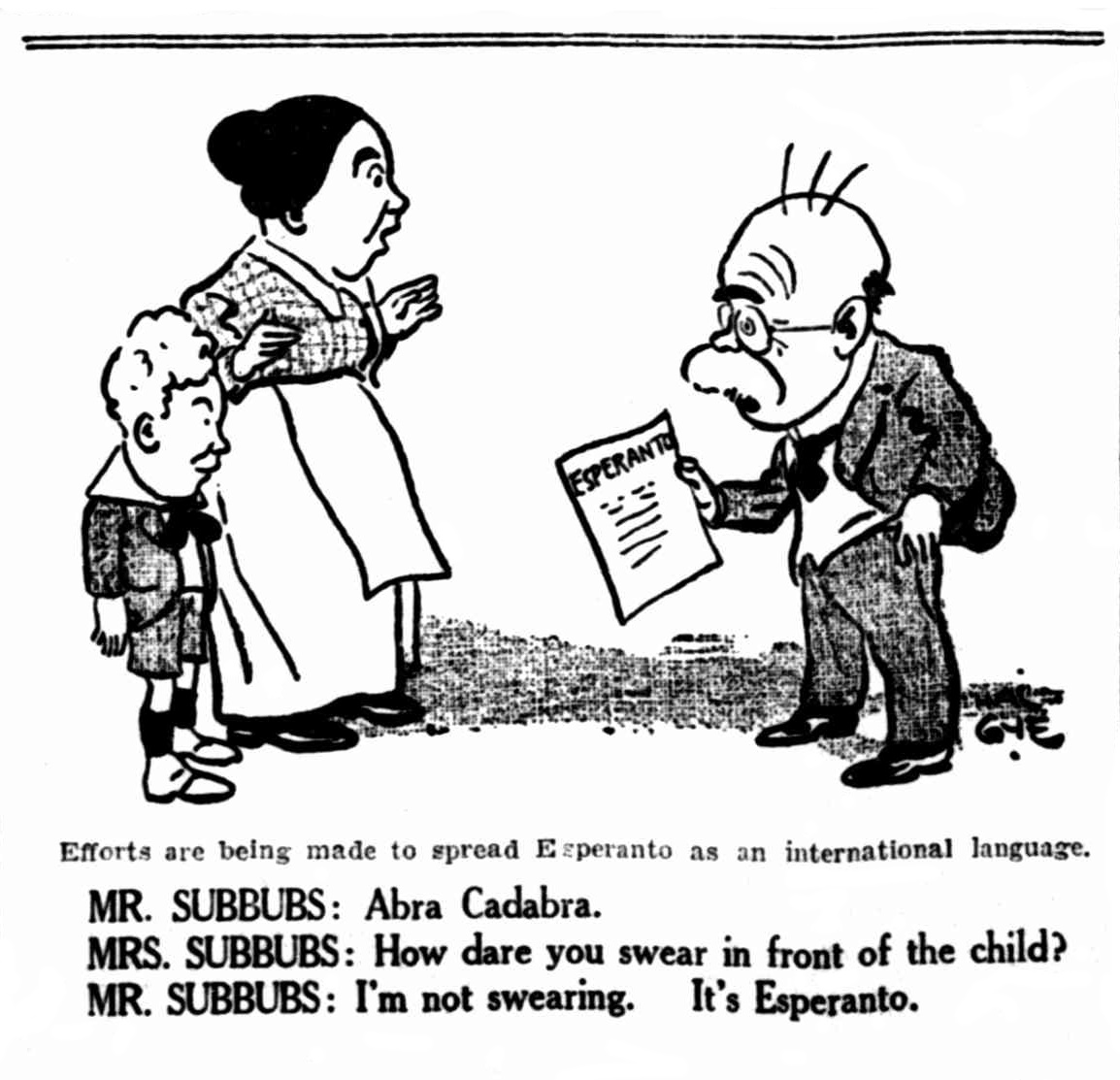
From The News (Adelaide), 1 December 1924.

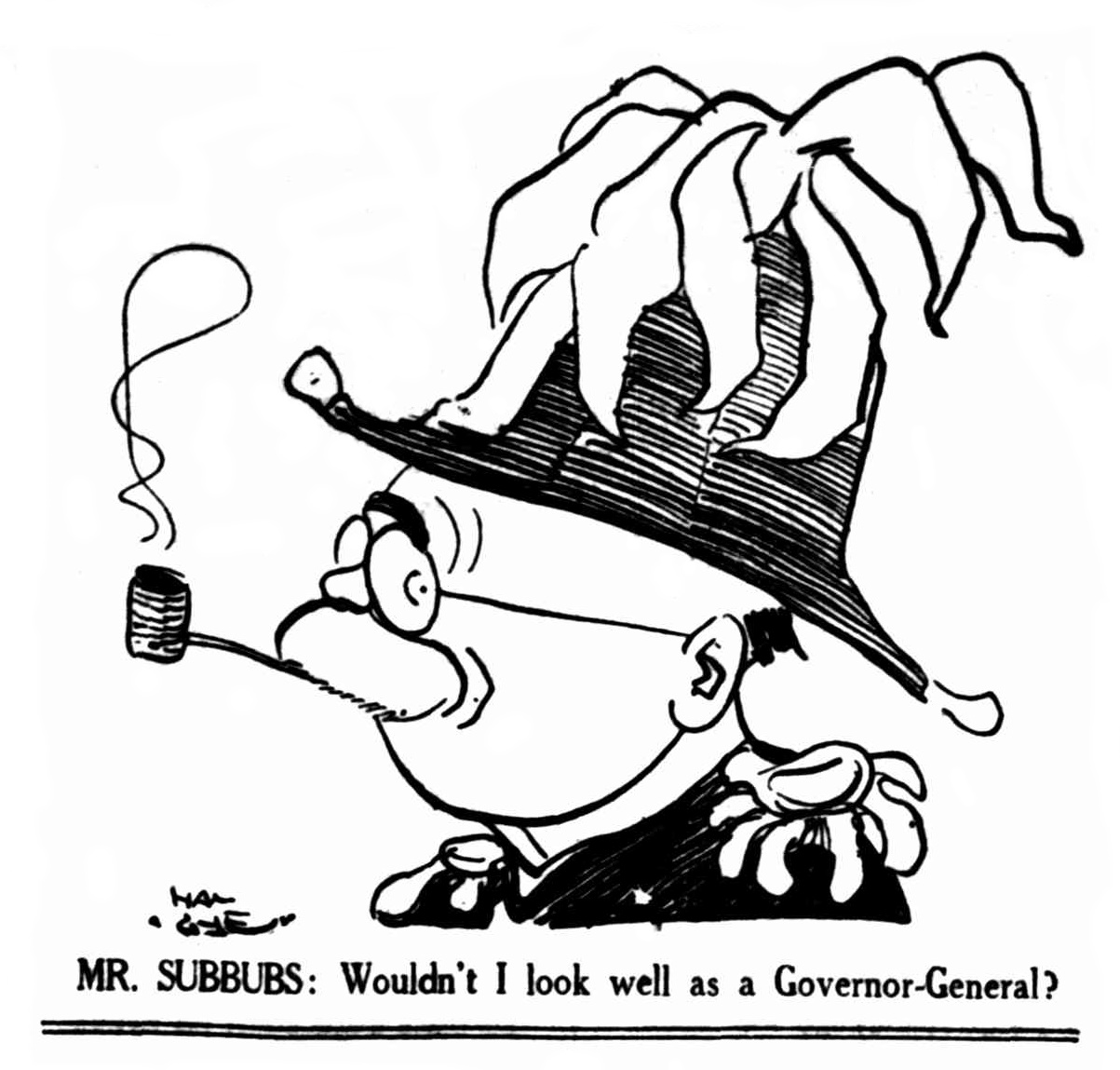
From The News, 8 October 1925.

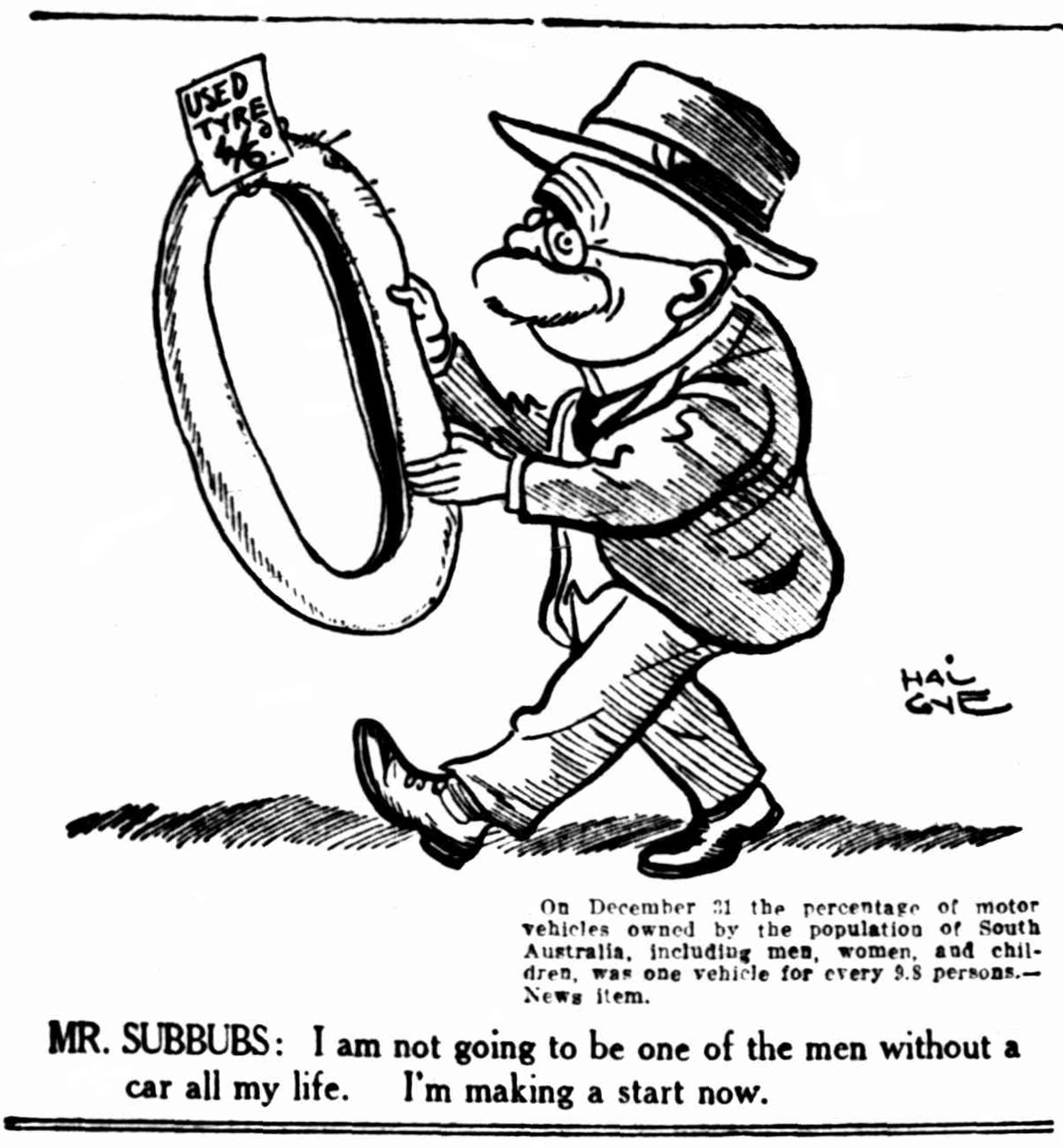
From The News, 18 June 1926.

A selection of Mr. Subbubs cartoons by Hal Gye.

From May 1919 to about February 1920 sporting-themed cartoons by Hal Gye were published in the Saturday 'Sporting Edition' of Melbourne's The Herald newspaper. In 1921 a book of Gye's cartoons and caricatures of players and officials of Melbourne's football clubs was published, titled Football Fragments.

In about June 1923 Gye was appointed chief artist on the staff of the daily afternoon Adelaide newspaper, The News. The broadsheet newspaper had previously been published as The Journal and was renamed after being acquired by James E. Davidson's News Limited company. In the first issue of The News, published on 24 July 1923, Gye introduced a cartoon character called 'Mr. Subbubs', described as "Adelaide's Man with a Grievance". Gye's cartoons featuring Mr. Subbubs, an 'everyman' figure, were a regular feature published in The News from July 1923 until June 1926. By mid-year 1924 the character of Mr. Subbubs had become so popular in Adelaide that his image was "being used to heighten the picturesqueness and appeal of various forms of advertising publicity", prompting The News to remind readers that the character 'is copyrighted and therefore cannot be utilised in any of these connections without express permission". In December 1925 the Mr. Subbubs Drawing Book for Kids was published which included "a quaintly humorous account of the schooldays of Mr. Subbubs", as well as instructions and illustrations by Gye on how to draw the face of Mr. Subbubs and an exposition of "the gentle art of caricaturing".

The collaborative partnership between Gye and C. J. Dennis ceased after the writer objected to "a direct arrangement between Angus and Robertson and Gye" relating to the illustrations for Rose of Spadgers. The book, subtitled A Sequel to Ginger Mick and with illustrations by Gye, was eventually published in December 1924 by the Cornstalk Publishing Company of Sydney.

Cartoons by Gye with sports themes were published in Melbourne's The Sporting Globe newspaper from about November 1932 to September 1933. An exhibition of coloured monotype prints by Hal Gye opened in late-May 1933 at the Fine Art Society's Gallery in Melbourne. Fifty-five works, which included landscapes and flower studies, were exhibited.

=== Later years ===
Gye had a serious motor accident in the early 1930s, after which he concentrated on writing. His autobiographical short stories began to be published in The Bulletin in June 1937 under the nom-de-plume of 'James Hackston'. The first to appear was 'The Lead Button', published on 2 June 1937. His short stories appeared occasionally in the magazine until June 1939. Gye also had verse published in The Bulletin during this period under his pseudonym (for example 'Loaming' published in April 1939). In 1954 Gye declared that "writing is a thousand times harder than drawing or painting", adding: "An artist can work without thinking too much sometimes; a writer has to keep on thinking all the time".

Gye's short stories, under his pseudonym, were included in Coast to Coast, the annual Australian short story anthology published by Angus and Robertson. Stories by 'James Hackston' appeared in the 1941, 1942 and 1945 editions of the anthology. Coast to Coast was published biennially from 1949. A short story by 'Hackston' was published in the 1951–52 edition.

During the 1940s verse and short stories written by Gye (under his pseudonym 'James Hackston') were published in The Bulletin (occasionally from 1940 to 1946 and more regularly from 1946 to 1949). His writings continued to be published in the magazine during the 1950s (semi-regularly from 1950 to 1954 and less frequently for the rest of the decade). During the period from August 1949 until the mid-1950s verse by Gye (under the nom-de-plume of 'Hacko') was also published in The Bulletin.

In 1959, following his attendance at a screening of the documentary film The Burnie Mill, Gye wrote and illustrated a poem published as The Sentimental Bloke and the Burnie Mill.

In 1963 Gye was invited to unveil the C. J. Dennis memorial plaque at the Southern Cross Hotel in Melbourne.

In 1966 Angus and Robertson published the collected short stories of 'James Hackston' in a volume titled Father Clears Out. The stories were illustrated by Hal Gye. The book included a foreword by Douglas Stewart, who disclosed (publicly for the first time) that the author and the artist "were one and the same person".

Hal Gye died on 25 November 1967 in the Melbourne suburb of Beaumaris, aged 80.

Gye's autobiography, The Hole in the Bedroom Floor, was published in 1969, two years after his death.

== Publications ==
- Ambrose Pratt (1909), The History of Aviation: Souvenir (illustrated by Hal Gye), Melbourne: Ambrose Pratt.
- Jo. Smith (1911), Pink Hill: An Incident in the South African War (illustrated by Alek Sass, George Dancey, Charles Nuttall, David Low, Albert Enes, Hal Gye, George Brandt), Elsternwick, Vic. : J. Smith.
- T. M. Hogan (1914), The Tight Little Island (illustrated by Hal Gye), Hobart: J. Walch & Sons
- C. J. Dennis (1915), The Songs of a Sentimental Bloke (with cover design and decorations by Hal Gye), Sydney: Angus and Robertson.
- Will H. Ogilvie (1916), The Australian and Other Verses (illustrated by Hal Gye), Sydney: Angus and Robertson.
- C. J. Dennis (1916), The Moods of Ginger Mick (illustrated by Hal Gye), Sydney: Angus and Robertson.
- C. J. Dennis (1917), Doreen (illustrated by Hal Gye), Sydney: Angus and Robertson.
- C. J. Dennis (1917), The Glugs of Gosh (with illustrations by Hal Gye), Sydney: Angus and Robertson.
- C. J. Dennis (1918), Backblock Ballads and Later Verses (illustrated by Hal Gye), Sydney: Angus and Robertson.
- C. J. Dennis (1919), Digger Smith (illustrated by Hal Gye), Sydney: Angus and Robertson.
- C. J. Dennis (1919), Jim of the Hills: A Story in Rhyme (illustrated by Hal Gye), Sydney: Angus and Robertson.
- A. B. Paterson (1921), Rio Grande and Other Verses (illustrated by Hal Gye), Sydney: Angus and Robertson.
- A. B. Paterson (1921), The collected verse of A. B. Paterson (with the original illustrations of Norman Lindsay, Hal Gye & Lionel Lindsay), Sydney: Angus and Robertson.
- Hal Gye (1921), Football Fragments: Cartoons and Caricatures, Melbourne: Alexander McCubbin.
- C. J. Dennis (1921), A Book for Kids (illustrated by Hal Gye), Sydney: Angus and Robertson.
- C. J. Dennis (1924), Rose of Spadgers: A Sequel to Ginger Mick (illustrated by Hal Gye), Sydney: Cornstalk.
- Hal Gye (1959), The Sentimental Bloke and the Burnie Mill, Burnie: Association Pulp and Paper Mills.
- James Hackston (Hal Gye) (1966), Father Clears Out (illustrated by Hal Gye), Sydney: Angus & Robertson.
- Hal Gye (1969), The Hole in the Bedroom Floor, Sydney: Angus and Robertson.

== Gallery ==
A selection of images by Hal Gye
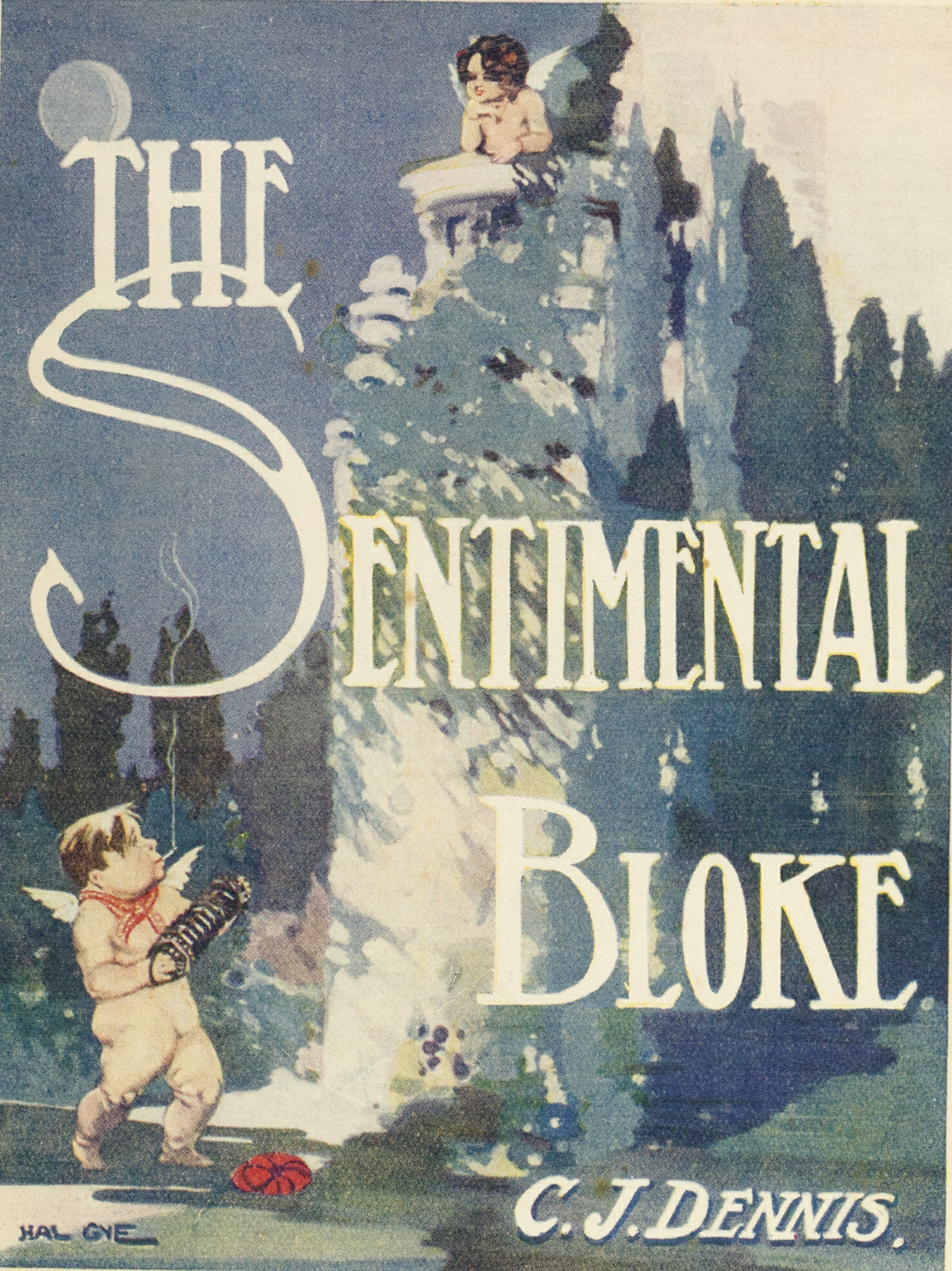
The cover of The Songs of a Sentimental Bloke (1915) by C. J. Dennis.

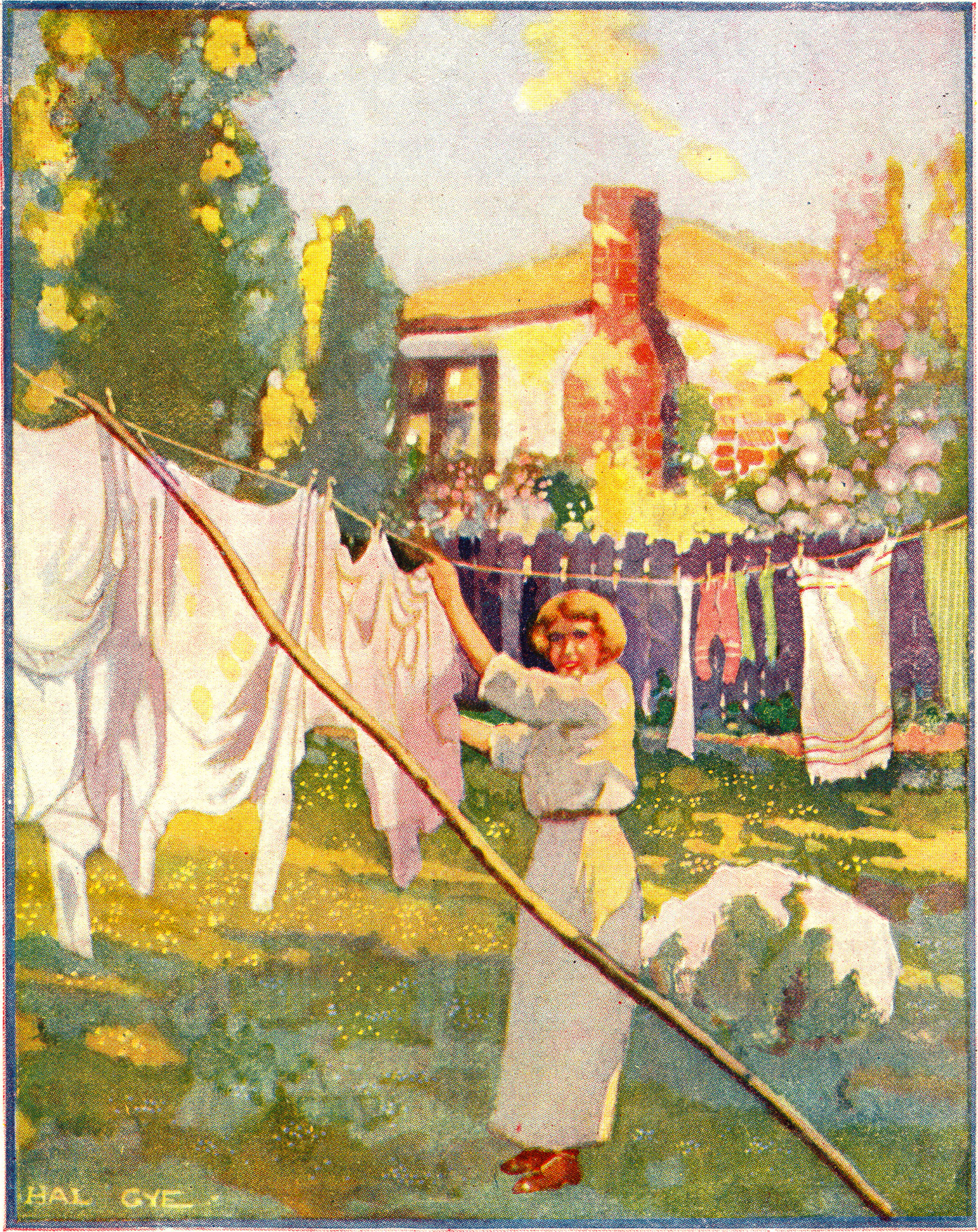
Plate One from Doreen (1917) by C. J. Dennis (captioned: "As she come walkin' in the grass, me little wife, Doreen.").

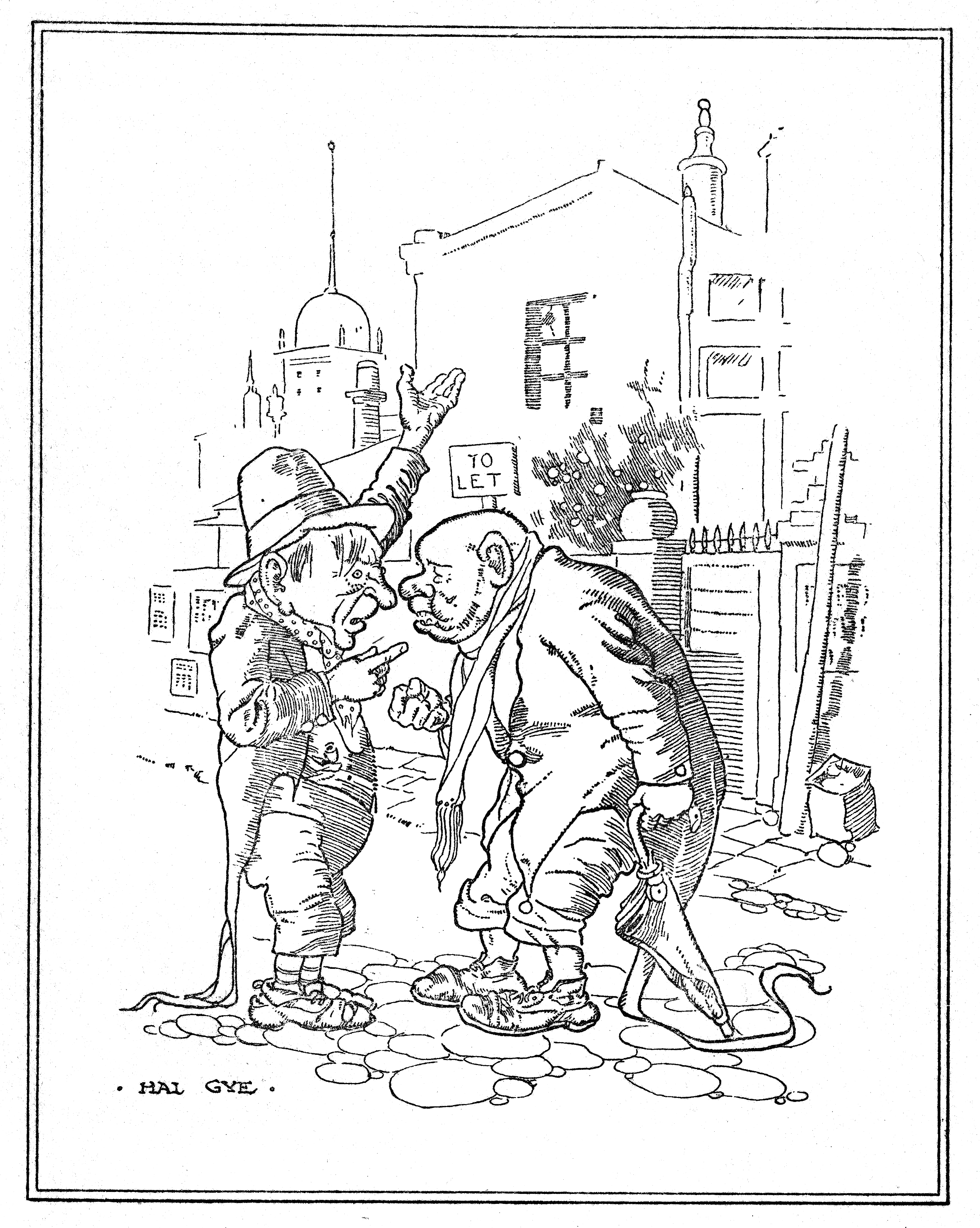
Illustration from The Glugs of Gosh (1917) by C. J. Dennis.

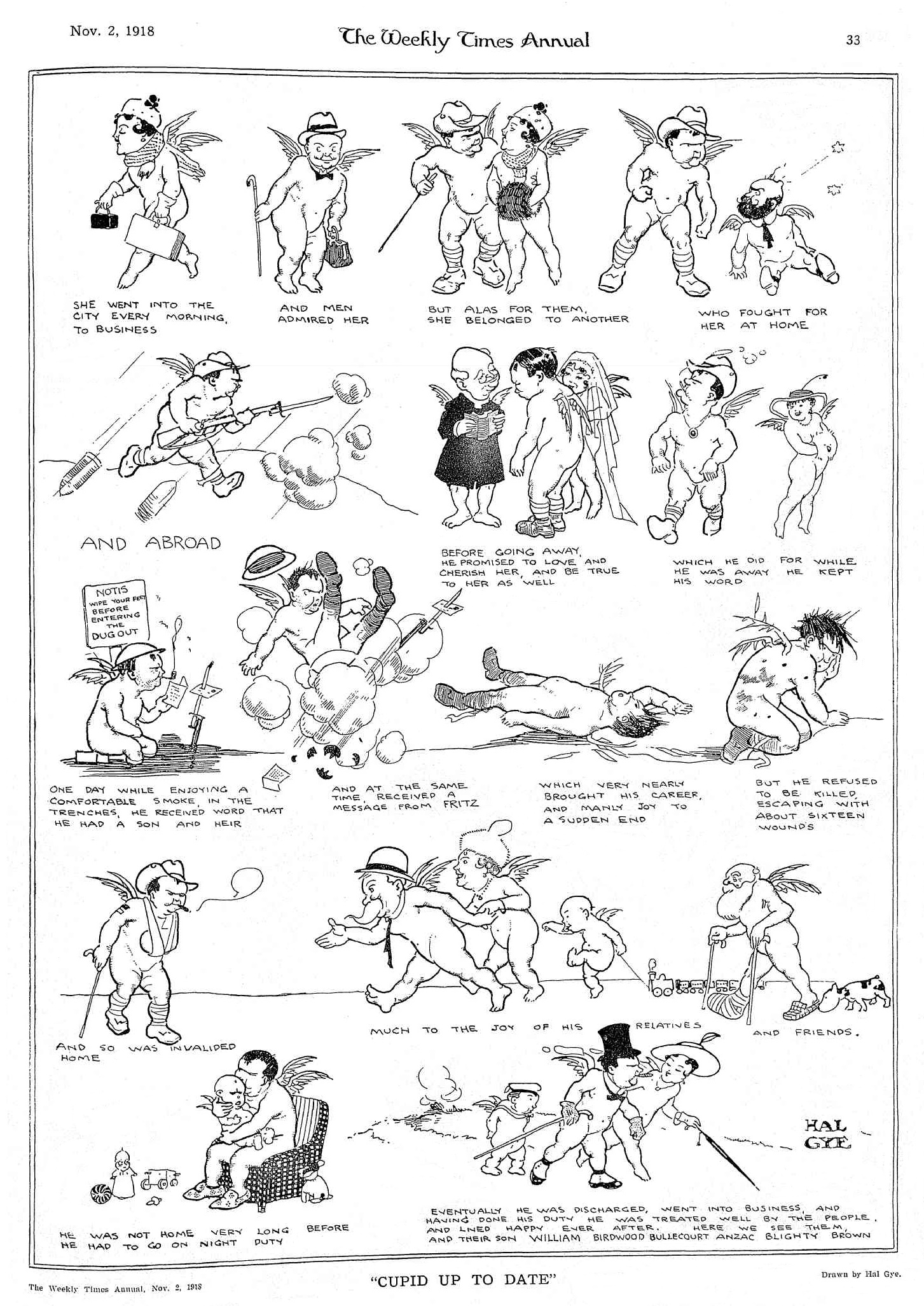
'Cupid Up to Date', published in The Weekly Times Annual, 2 November 1918.

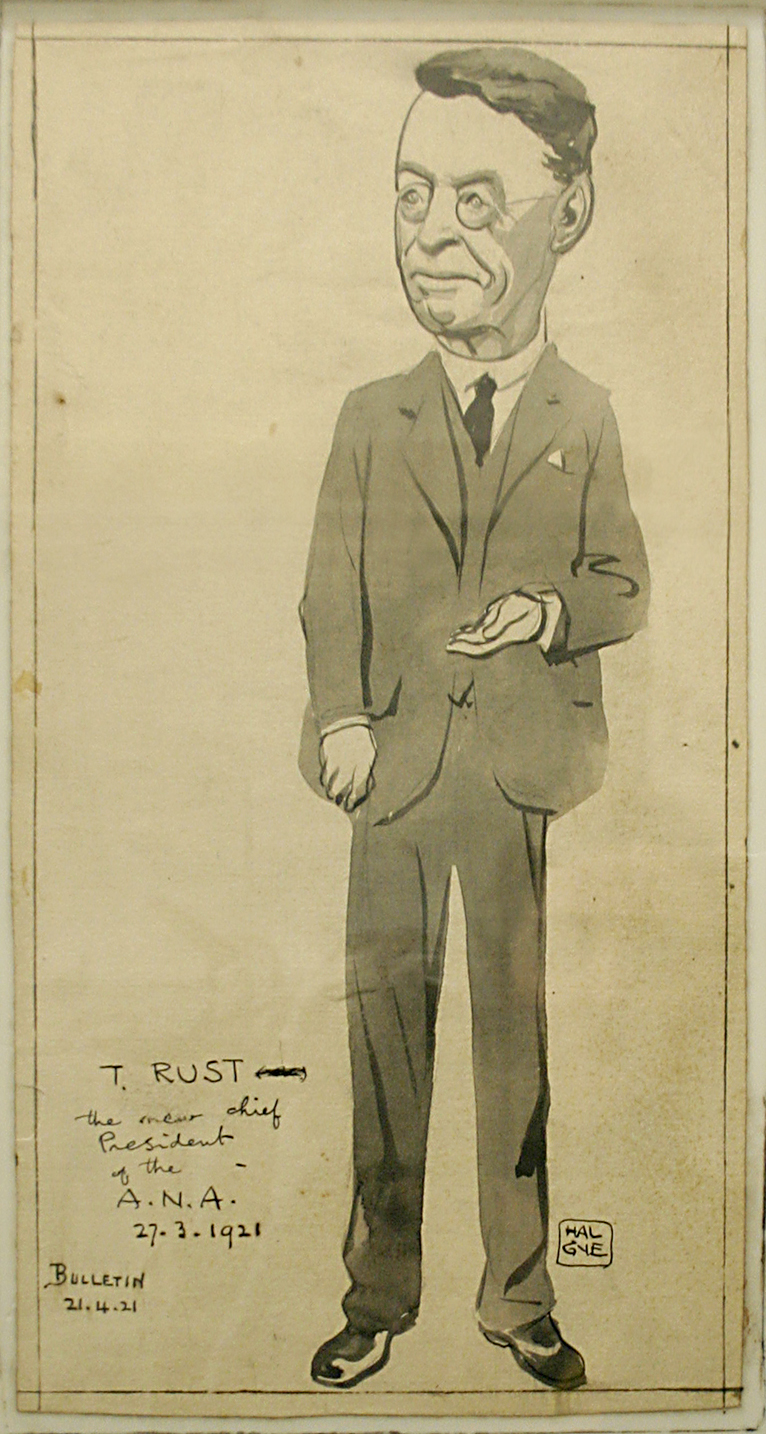
Caricature of Thomas Rust, dated March 1921.

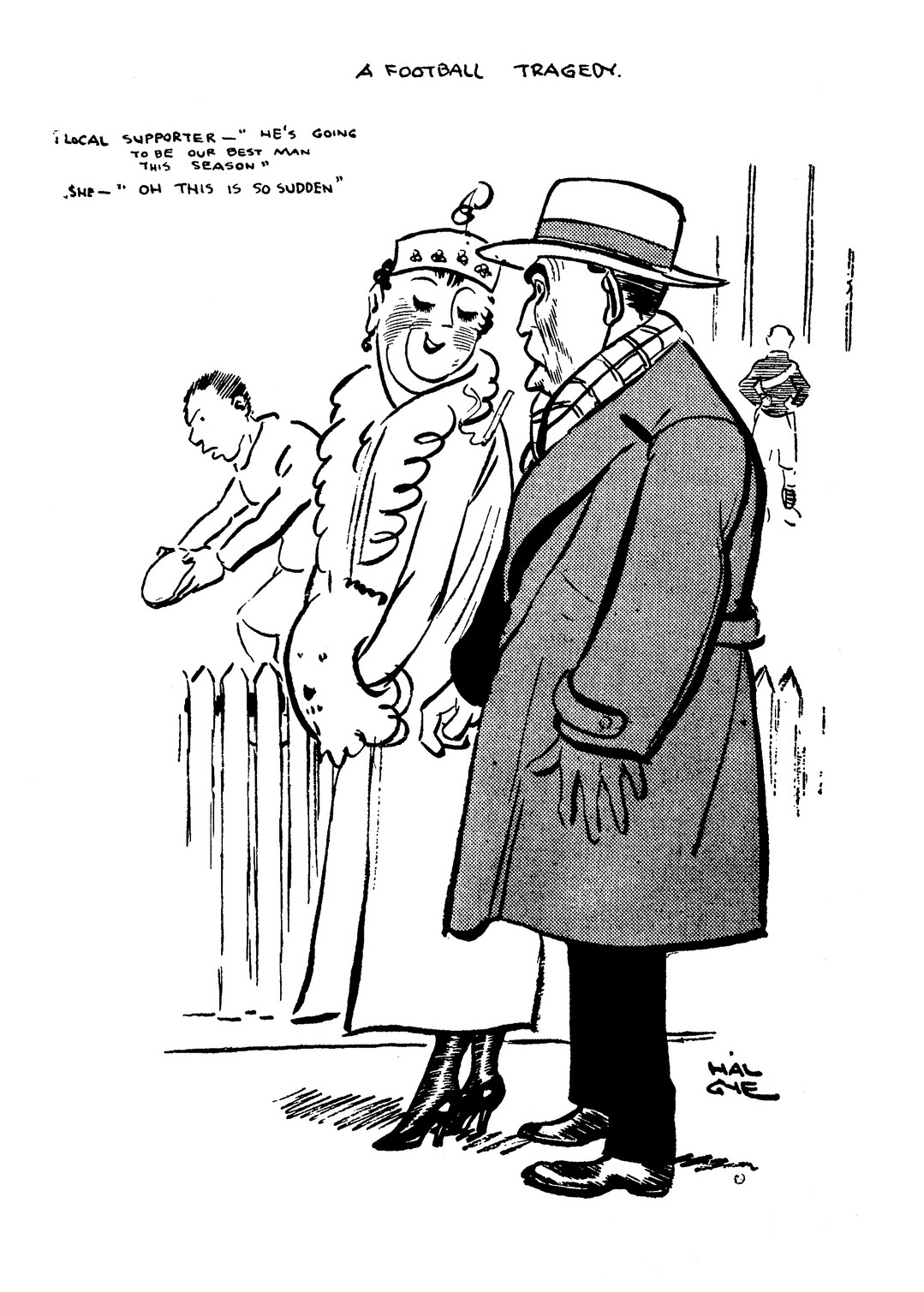
'A Football Tragedy' from Football Fragments by Hal Gye, published in 1921.

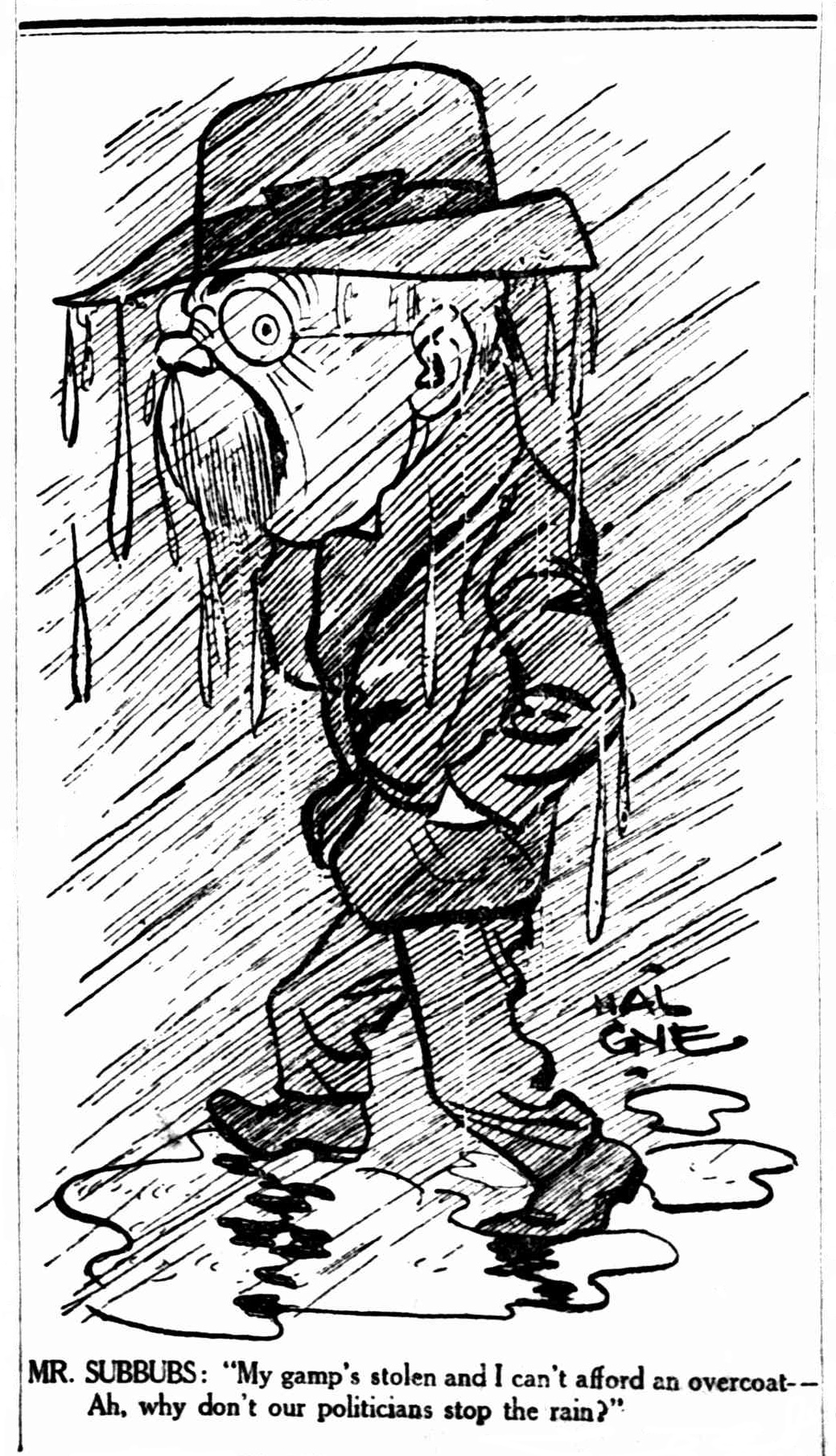
'Mr. Subbubs: "My gamp's stolen and I can't afford an overcoat. Ah, why don't our politicians stop the rain?"', published in The News (Adelaide), 2 August 1923.

== Notes ==
A.Harold and his father were descendants of the Devonshire branch of the French Huguenot family of De Rohan-Gyé. In her biography of Hal Gye, Elizabeth Lane states that the artist insisted that his surname "was pronounced 'Ji'" (with a soft-g initial-sound, rhyming with 'eye').

B.The artists contributing to the first and only issue of Vumps were Claude Marquet, Fred Brown, Ambrose Dyson, Mick Paul, Hugh MacLean, George Treeby ('Bron'), Sid Treeby, Will Donald, Pat Sullivan, George C. Benson, Ted Colles, Val McNalley, Harry Julius, Hal Gye and Paul Bleeck. The writers for the comic included Henry Lawson, E. J. Brady, Roderic Quinn, Howard C. Coghlan, Robert J. 'Bob' Cassidy ('Gilrooney'), Donald E. Fraser ('Jimmie Pannikin'), Tom Mutch, 'Narranghi Boori', Terence Desmond, 'Hamer', J. Harding Tucker, J. F. Higgins and Norman Lilley.
