= Nancy Brown (actress) =

Australian singer, actress, and lyricist (1909–2003)

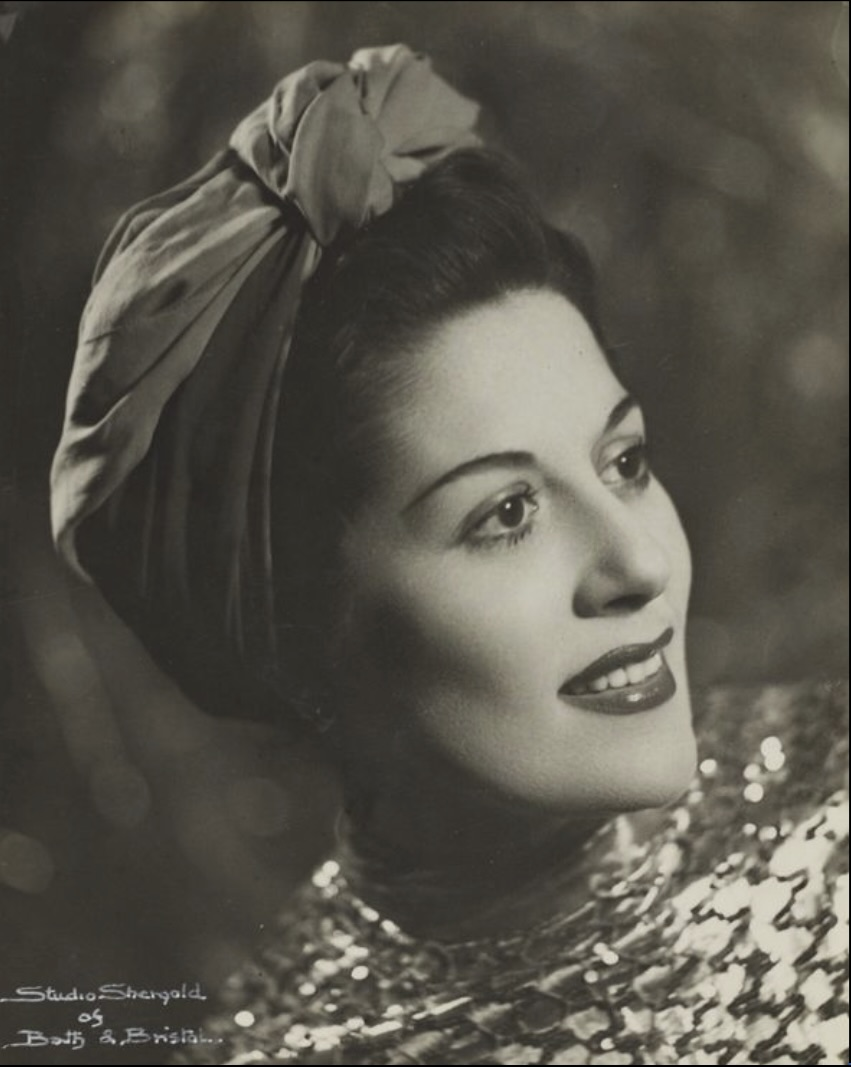
- Brown in 1949
- Born: 26 August 1909; New Farm, Queensland, Australia
- Died: 27 October 2003 (aged 94); Maroochydore, Queensland, Australia
- Spouses: Oscar Donald Thompson (married 1929, divorced); Albert Arlen (married 1949–1993 (his death)

Nancy Brown (26 August 1909 – 27 October 2003) was an Australian actress, singer and songwriter. She is best known for The Sentimental Bloke, a 1961 musical for which she co-wrote the lyrics with her husband, Albert Arlen and Lloyd Thomson.

== Early life and education ==
Brown was born in New Farm, Queensland on 26 August 1909. She was the first-born child of Rita Lillian (née Collins) and manager George Earle Brown. A move to Sydney, her mother's home town, led to her studying at Brighton College in Randwick. Following her parents' subsequent separation, she went to London, at her cousin Arthur Benjamin's invitation. Her final year of secondary education was at Dorking High School, after which she enrolled at the Royal Academy of Dramatic Art (RADA) in 1925.

== Career ==
While still a 16-year-old student at RADA, in 1926 Brown appeared at the Savoy Theatre in The Unfair Sex, having taken over a principal role at short notice following the illness of Rosalie Courtneidge. In the same year she was in Love's a Terrible Thing. A "reliable understudy", Brown learned leading roles in Rose Marie, The Desert Song, Show Boat and Bitter Sweet, but did not have many opportunities to appear on stage. Noël Coward, however, sent her to America with Bitter Sweet in 1929 and she also toured Canada.

In 1932, after a five-month search, Brown, with no film experience, was selected for the leading role of Teresa in The Maid of the Mountains, a film adapted from the musical of the same name by Harold Fraser-Simson. The following year she appeared in two more films based on musicals and directed by Harry Hughes, Facing the Music and A Southern Maid. She was also in Paul L. Stein's drama film, Red Wagon.

She was thrilled to star for 18 months with Richard Tauber in his 1943 operetta, Old Chelsea, in England, noting his generosity to fellow cast members. Other performances were with comedian Bud Flanagan.

Brown returned to Australia in 1948. She was invited to headline in the Centaur Presents concerts, organised in 1949 to raise money for the Centaur Memorial Fund for Nurses.

In 1961, she, her husband, Albert Arlen, and Lloyd Thomson produced a week-long season of their musical version of The Sentimental Bloke. Sir Frank Tait and John McCallum saw it and a six-week season was arranged at the Comedy Theatre in Melbourne. The musical went on tour and took over £250,000. This production was considered by Tony Sheldon to be Australia's best-known musical.

Brown wrote her memoir, The Black Sheep of the Brown Family: A magic life!, in 2001.

== Personal ==
Brown married twice, firstly, in 1929 to Oscar Donald Thompson, who sang as Donald Kingston. Her second marriage was to Albert Arlen in 1949. Arlen predeceased her in 1993 in Queensland. She died at Maroochydore on 27 October 2003.
