= The Songs of a Sentimental Bloke =

1915 book by C. J. Dennis

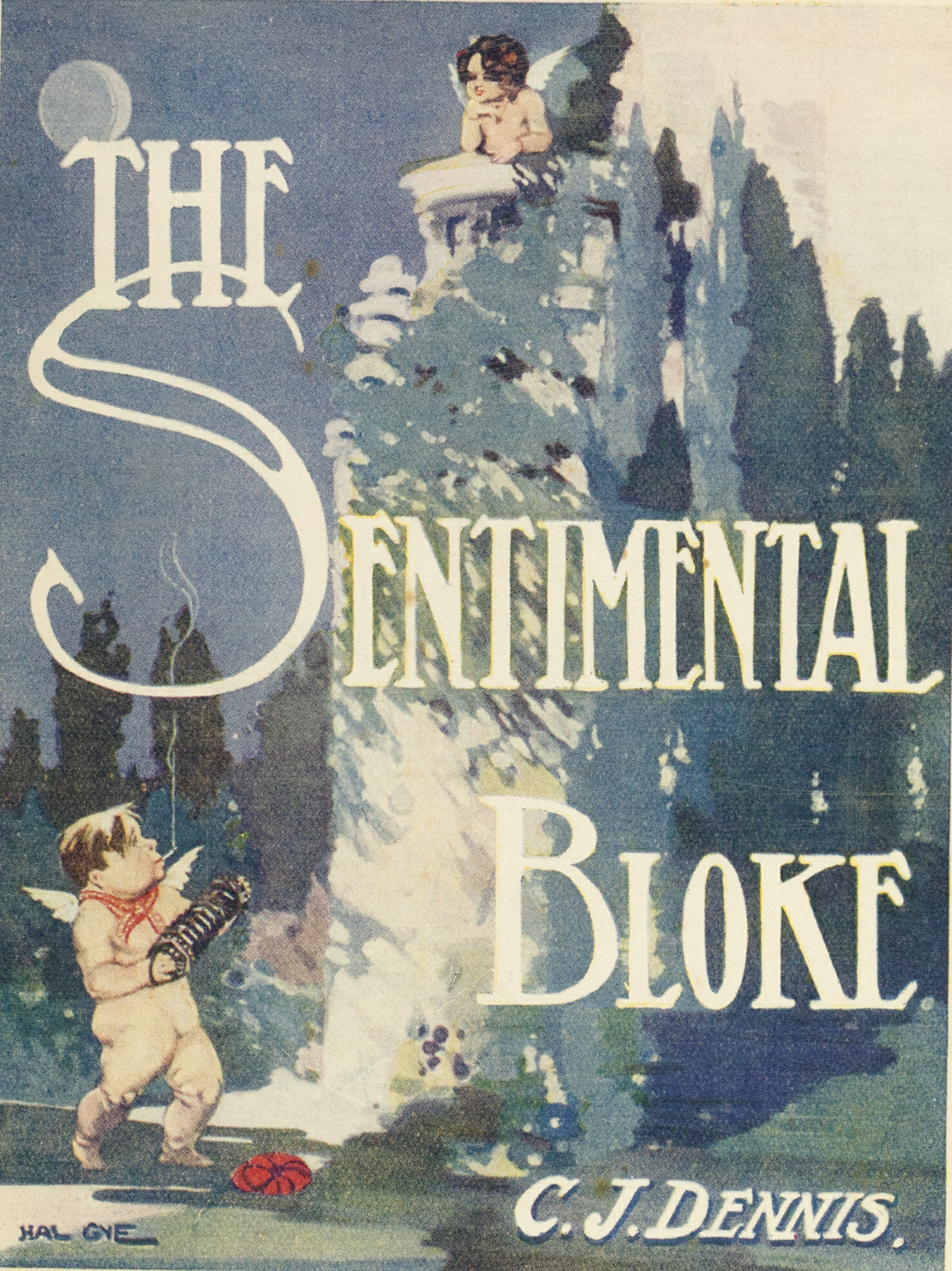
- Author: C. J. Dennis
- Language: English
- Genre: Verse novel
- Publisher: Angus & Robertson
- Publication date: 1915
- Publication place: Australia
- Media type: Print (hardback & paperback)
- Pages: 113, plus 14 pages of Glossary
- ISBN: 0-207-14366-8
- OCLC: 29006080
- Preceded by: Backblock Ballads and Other Verses
- Followed by: The Moods of Ginger Mick
- Text: The Songs of a Sentimental Bloke at Wikisource

The Songs of a Sentimental Bloke is a verse novel by Australian poet and journalist C. J. Dennis. Portions of the work appeared in The Bulletin between 1909 and 1915, the year the verse novel was completed and published by Angus & Robertson. Written in the rough and comical Australian slang that was Dennis' signature style, the work became immensely popular in Australia, selling over 60,000 copies in nine editions within the first year of publication.

The Songs of a Sentimental Bloke tells the story of Bill, a member of a larrikin push (or gang) in Melbourne's Little Lon red-light district, who encounters Doreen, a young woman "of some social aspiration", in a local market. Narrated by Bill, the poems chronicle their courtship and marriage, detailing his transformation from a violence-prone gang member to a contented husband and father.

The book has been adapted into many works across a variety of media, including Raymond Longford and Lottie Lyell's The Sentimental Bloke (1918), widely regarded as one of Australia's greatest silent films. Though the novel's popularity peaked during World War I and the interwar period, it remains a classic of Australian literature and the best-selling book of poetry ever produced in the country. Dennis subsequently became known as the 'laureate of the larrikin', as well as 'the Anzac laureate', with many diggers owning and cherishing pocket editions while serving in World War I.

== Contents ==
1. A Spring Song — Bill is discontent but he doesn't know why. He attributes it to the season. He sees a girl whom he describes as his ideal partner.
2. The Intro — Bill attempts to talk to the girl, Doreen, but she rebuffs him because he is a stranger. Bill finds out that she works in a pickle factory, and arranges for a man he knows who works there to introduce them. They talk, and later arrange a date.
3. The Stoush O' Day — Bill reflects on how time has flown since he met Doreen.
4. Doreen — Bill promises Doreen that he'll give up drinking.
5. The Play — Bill takes Doreen to see Romeo and Juliet.
6. The Stror 'at Coot — A man who wears a boater hat hangs around Doreen. Bill takes offence and fights him. Doreen breaks things off with Bill.
7. The Siren — Bill goes to a party and Doreen is there. She sings a song about unrequited love which affects Bill. He follows her outside, and they make up.
8. Mar — Bill meets Doreen's mother, who calls Bill "Willy", as her future son-in-law must be respectable. She and Bill begin talking about wedding plans, and Bill's job.
9. Pilot Cove — Doreen and Bill go to see the priest to talk about the gravity of marriage.
10. Hitched — Doreen and Bill's wedding ceremony. They set off on their honeymoon.
11. Beef Tea — Ginger Mick encourages Bill to drink and gamble, and Doreen's feelings are hurt. Bill takes himself outside for a long time, and comes back in, feeling sick. He falls asleep and wakes up to Doreen feeding him beef tea - a staple of invalid cooking - and Bill is astonished that she has forgiven him.
12. Uncle Jim
13. The Kid
14. The Mooch o' Life

== Publication details ==
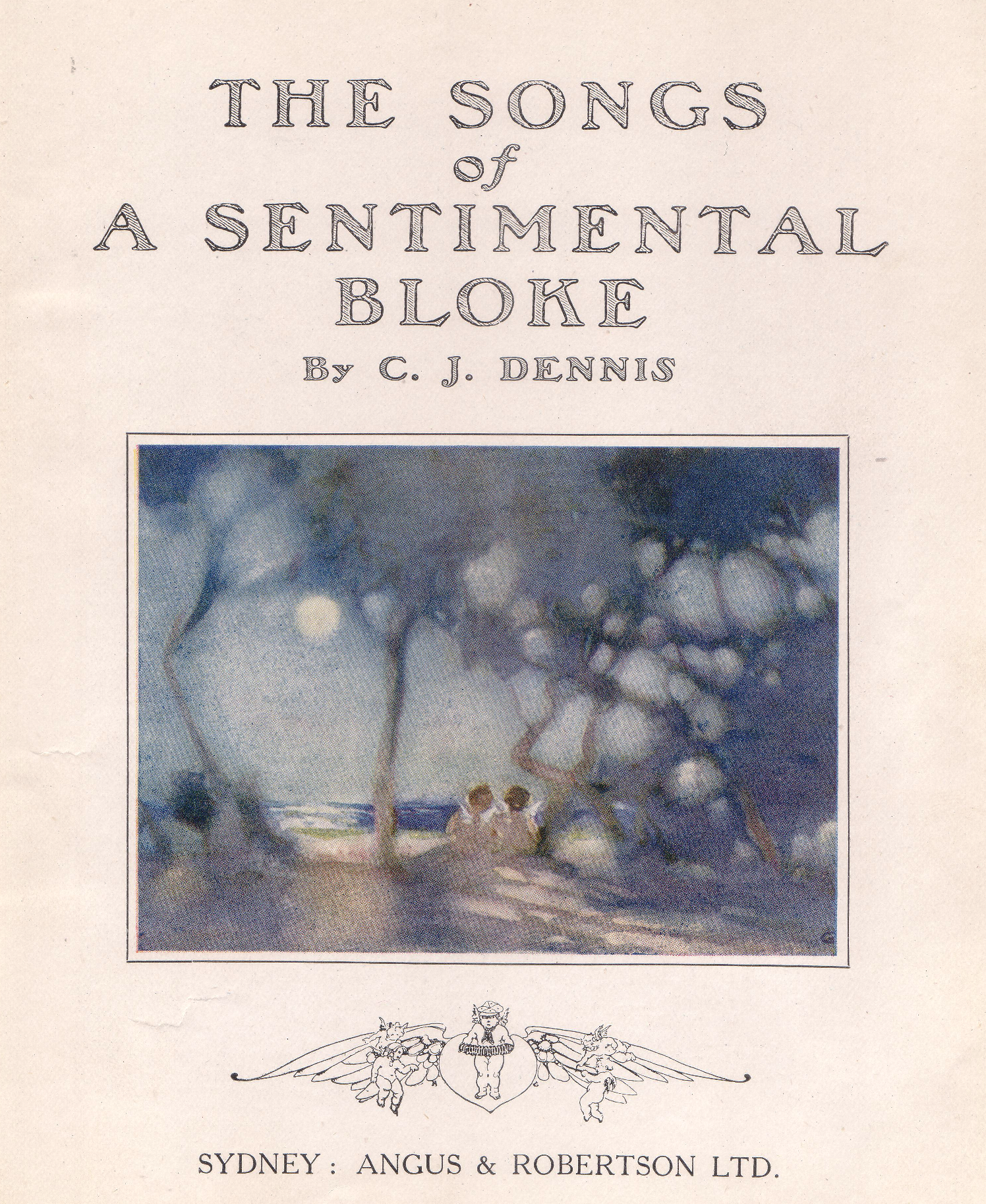
Cover of a 1916 edition

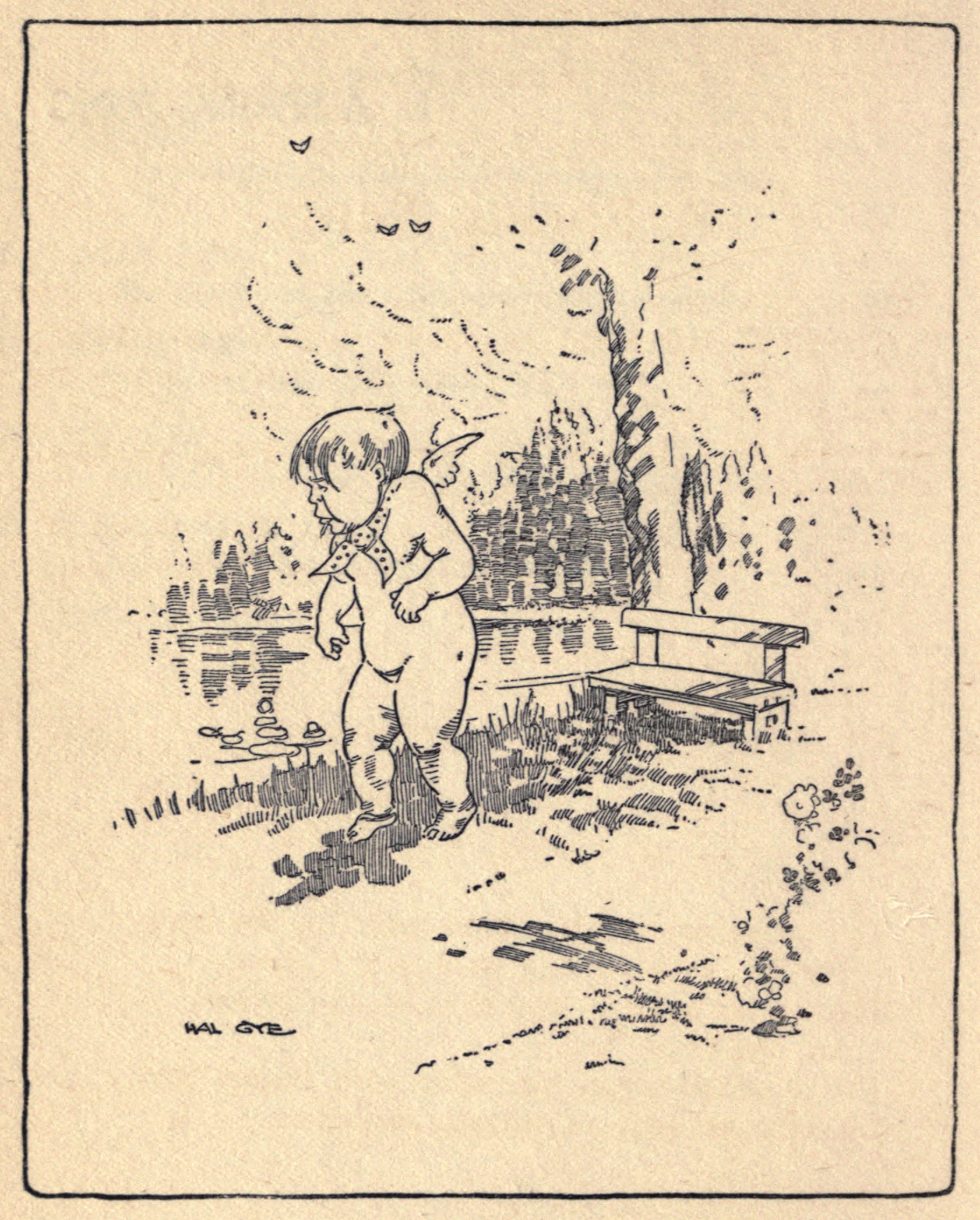
Illustration of 'the bloke' for verse 1. A Spring Song

The first portion of the novel, The Stoush O' Day, was originally published in The Bulletin on 1 April 1909. All bar two of the remaining chapters were also published in that magazine between 1909 and 1915.

The completed work was first published in book form in Sydney on 9 October 1915.

Publication details

First Edition	Sydney	9 October 1915	2,500 copies
Second impression	Sydney	2 November 1915	5,000 copies
Third impression	Sydney	6 December	5,000 copies
Fourth impression	Sydney	25 January 1916	5,000 copies
Fifth impression	Sydney	22 February 1916	7,000 copies
Sixth impression	Sydney	1 April 1916	5,500 copies
Seventh impression	Sydney	30 May 1916	11,000 copies
Eighth impression	Sydney	1 April 1916	5,000 copies
Pocket edition	Sydney	25 September 1916	10,000 copies
Tenth impression	Sydney	7 October 1916	8,000 copies
Eleventh impression	Sydney	24 October 1916	5,000 copies
Twelfth impression	Sydney	17 November 1916	5,000 copies
Thirteenth impression	Sydney	2 May 1917	5,000 copies
Fourteenth impression	London	1 July 1917	5,000 copies
Fifteenth impression	Sydney	1 August 1917	5,000 copies
Sixteenth impression	London	21 May 1918	5,000 copies
Seventeenth impression	Sydney	14 June 1919	3,000 copies
Eighteenth impression	Sydney	31 August 1919	3,000 copies
Nineteenth impression	Sydney	20 April 1920	3,000 copies
Twentieth impression	Sydney	31 August 1920	3,000 copies

== Notes ==
Dennis stated that his Sentimental Bloke character was inspired by a larrikin horse trainer he had briefly known in 1909. In 2025, independent researcher Gary Fearon identified the likely real-life model for the character as William Edward Mitchell, a horse trainer who enlisted in the AIF soon after the outbreak of World War I and was killed in action in 1917.

The book is dedicated "To Mr and Mrs J.G. Roberts". John Garibaldi Roberts was a book-loving public servant working with the Melbourne Tramways Company when he was introduced to C. J. Dennis by R. H. Croll in 1906. He was later to provide much material and emotional support to Dennis during the writing of this work. Dennis later took to calling them "Dad" and "Mum".

The verse novel's first edition includes a foreword by bush poet Henry Lawson, who writes that The Sentimental Bloke's original appearance in The Bulletin "brightened up many dark days for me", and that, in Bill, Dennis had created a character "more perfect than any alleged 'larrikin' or Bottle-O character I have ever attempted to sketch". The first edition also featured a glossary of words, compiled by Dennis, "for the use of those unacquainted with the 'Australian language'".

Dennis went on to publish three sequels to this verse novel: The Moods of Ginger Mick (1916), Doreen (1917) and Rose of Spadgers (1924). The Moods of Ginger Mick told the story of Bill's mate, Ginger Mick, who went to fight at Gallipoli. Like its predecessor, it was also very successful, and it earned Dennis the title of "the laureate of the Anzac".

The illustrations of the bloke, cupid-like and "whimsical", were provided by Hal Gye.

== Adaptations ==
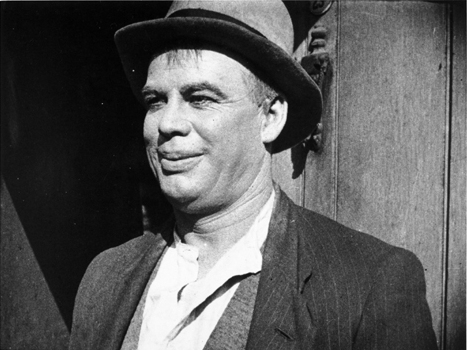
Arthur Tauchert as Bill in The Sentimental Bloke (1918)

Two film versions of The Songs of a Sentimental Bloke have been produced: The Sentimental Bloke, a silent version, in 1918, written and directed by Raymond Longford, and which starred Arthur Tauchert as Bill and Lottie Lyell as Doreen; and a "talkie" version in 1932, directed by F. W. Thring and based on a screenplay by C. J. Dennis.

A three-act stage adaptation of The Songs of a Sentimental Bloke by Bert Bailey, titled The Sentimental Bloke, premiered at the King's Theatre, Melbourne on 7 October 1922.

In 1961, a musical called The Sentimental Bloke was produced in Canberra, and later in Melbourne and other cities. The music was by Albert Arlen, with lyrics by Arlen, Nancy Brown and Lloyd Thomson.

The Sentimental Bloke is a 1963 Australian television film. It was a half-hour ballet aired on ABC Television.

A television adaptation of the musical appeared in 1976, written and directed by Alan Burke and featuring Graeme Blundell as Bill.

A ballet version was choreographed by Robert Ray, with Albert Arlen's music freely arranged by John Lanchbery. This was presented by The Australian Ballet in 1985 and on its tour of the Soviet Union.

A second musical theatre version was written by Graeme Blundell with music by George Dreyfus premiered by the Melbourne Theatre Company at the Playhouse, Victorian Arts Centre on 12 December 1985. This musical was subsequently produced in Perth (Western Australian Theatre Company, 1986), Darwin (State Theatre Company of Northern Territory, 1987) and Brisbane (Royal Queensland Theatre Company, 1988).

Another theatrical production of The Songs of a Sentimental Bloke was staged at Eltham Little Theatre, Melbourne, in 2021.

== Recorded versions ==
In 2009, actor Jack Thompson released an album featuring his own recitations of Dennis's poems, entitled The Sentimental Bloke, The Poems of C.J. Dennis.
