= The Moods of Ginger Mick =

1916 verse novel by C. J. Dennis

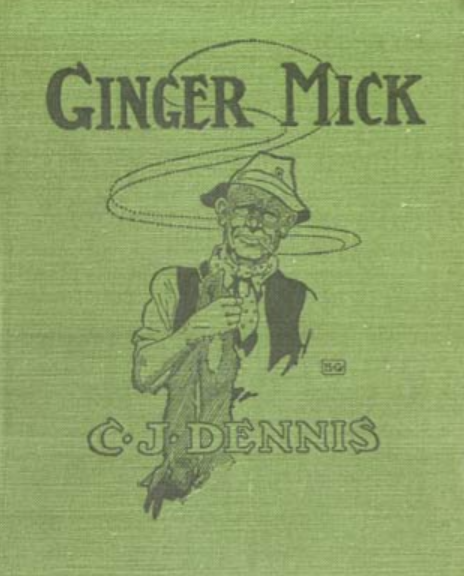
- Author: C. J. Dennis
- Language: English
- Genre: Verse novel
- Publisher: Angus and Robertson
- Publication date: 1916
- Publication place: Australia
- Media type: Print
- Pages: 143 pp
- Preceded by: The Songs of a Sentimental Bloke
- Followed by: The Glugs of Gosh
- Text: The Moods of Ginger Mick at Wikisource

The Moods of Ginger Mick is a verse novel by Australian poet and journalist C. J. Dennis, published by Angus and Robertson, in 1916. The collection includes fifteen illustrated plates by Hal Gye.

The novel is a sequel to the poet's The Songs of a Sentimental Bloke and tells the story of Ginger Mick, a minor character from that first novel.

Eight of the poems included here were first published in The Bulletin magazine; the rest were published here for the first time.

== Dedication ==
- "To the boys who took the count"

== Contents ==
- "Introduction"
- "Duck an' Fowl"
- "War"
- "The Call of Stoush"
- "The Push"
- "Sari Bair"
- "Ginger's Cobber"
- "The Singing Soldiers"
- "In Spadger's Lane"
- "The Straight Griffen"
- "A Letter to the Front"
- "Rabbits"
- "To the Boys Who Took the Count"
- "The Game"
- "A Gallant Gentleman"

== Critical reception ==
A reviewer in The Daily Telegraph (Sydney) compared this book with the previous one by the author: "The undercurrent of seriousness in these verses is of immediate interest; but it has not the universal application of the first volume. On that account, and because The Moods of Ginger Mick is a second effort in the same manner, it is not so attractive as The Sentimental Bloke. It is, however, remarkably successful as a continuation of the style and language of that book. The local argot, part native and part American, is limited in extent, and Mr. Dennis has rung the changes on it without appearing monotonous. His skill as a versifier and his unfailing humor have made 'Ginger Mick' as real and interesting a personage as his mate of the first book. It is quite in character that the former should be matter of fact, and that the latter should supply all the sentimentality there is in the second book."

The critic in The Age had a similar view: "After the difficult process of making a reputation comes the equally difficult one of living up to it. With The Sentimental Bloke C. J. Dennis gained a place in the public estimation in the very forefront of Australian poets. No other Australian book of verse has had so wide a circulation or gathered for its author so large a bouquet of literary praise. These are very definite disadvantages that his new book is now obliged to face. It will be widely read, because every reader of The Sentimental Bloke is bound to seek a copy, and it will be judged for good or bad accordingly. This is in many ways a pity. The Moods of Ginger Mick is a volume of good Australian verse, none of it slovenly or flat, some of it very brilliant and human, but it is not as good, not anything like as good as 'The Sentimental Bloke'. There are two poems in the volume, 'In Spadger's-lane' and 'A Gallant Gentleman' that are as fine as anything that Dennis has ever written, they indeed ensure his reputation as one of Australia's foremost poets; but there are thirteen other poems in the book, and some are very nearly dull. The Sentimental Bloke wrote of himself and Doreen with spontaneity; he seems to write of Ginger Mick out of a sense of duty. His shrewd philosophy (save in the two poems named) has become didactic and platitudinous. This is all criticism 'in comparison.' Had the book stood alone we might justly stress the consummate skill with which Dennis handles Australian slang, his mastery of many different verse forms, and his sure ear for good swinging rhythm."

== Publication history ==
After the initial publication of the collection by Angus and Robertson in 1916, it was reissued as follows:

- Angus and Robertson, Australia, 1916 - Trench edition
- Angus and Robertson, Australia, reprinted 1917, 1918, 1919, 1920
- Angus and Robertson, UK, 1917
- S. B. Gundy, Canada and John Lane Co, USA, 1917, 1918
- Angus and Robertson, Australia, 1976
- Kessinger Publishing, USA, 2008
- Sydney University Press, Australia, 2009
- HarperCollins, Australia, 2018 - Trench edition facsimile
- An eBook edition: edited by John Gough: 2017. The Annotated Moods of Ginger Mick. (Amazon US)

== Film adaptation ==
The novel was adapted for the screen in 1920 under the title Ginger Mick. The silent film was directed by Raymond Longford from a screenplay by Longford and Lottie Lyell. It featured Gilbert Emery as Ginger Mick, Arthur Tauchert as The Bloke and Lottie Lyell as Doreen.

The film is considered a lost film as no copies have survived.

== Note ==
- Dennis had intended to include the poem "The Battle of Wazzir" in the 1916 edition, however it was removed at the insistence of the censor.

== See also ==
- cjdennis.com.au
- 1916 in Australian literature
- "Chapter 7: Towards The Moods of Ginger Mick, 1915-1916" in An Unsentimental Bloke: The Life and Work of C. J. Dennis by Philip Butterss
