= The Sentimental Bloke (1985 musical) =

Australian musical theatre

The Sentimental Bloke is an Australian musical with music by George Dreyfus and book and lyrics by Graeme Blundell. It is an adaptation of C. J. Dennis' The Songs of a Sentimental Bloke.

The musical premiered by the Melbourne Theatre Company at the Playhouse, Victorian Arts Centre on 12 December 1985. It featured John Jarratt as The Sentimental Bloke, Julie Mullins as Doreen, Michael Bishop as Ginger Mick, and Faye Bendrups as Rose. It was subsequently produced in Perth (Western Australian Theatre Company, 1986), Darwin (State Theatre Company of Northern Territory, 1987) and Brisbane (Royal Queensland Theatre Company, 1988).

The Dreyfus-Blundell musical is the second musical adapted from C.J. Dennis' original verse novel, with an earlier work also titled The Sentimental Bloke having its professional premiere in 1961. The Dreyfus-Blundell version also covers content from the Dennis' sequels such as Ginger Mick in the First World War.
