= The Sentimental Bloke (1963 film) =

The Sentimental Bloke is a 1963 Australian television film. It was a half-hour ballet aired on ABC. It is based on the poem, The Songs of a Sentimental Bloke by C. J. Dennis.

A copy of the telecast is held by the National Film and Sound Archive, despite having aired in an era where wiping was common. It was recorded at ABC's studios in Southbank.

== Cast ==
- Jack Manuel as The Bloke
- Carolyn Harrison as Doreen
- Maxwell Collis as Stror 'at Coot
