= George Dreyfus =

Australian composer

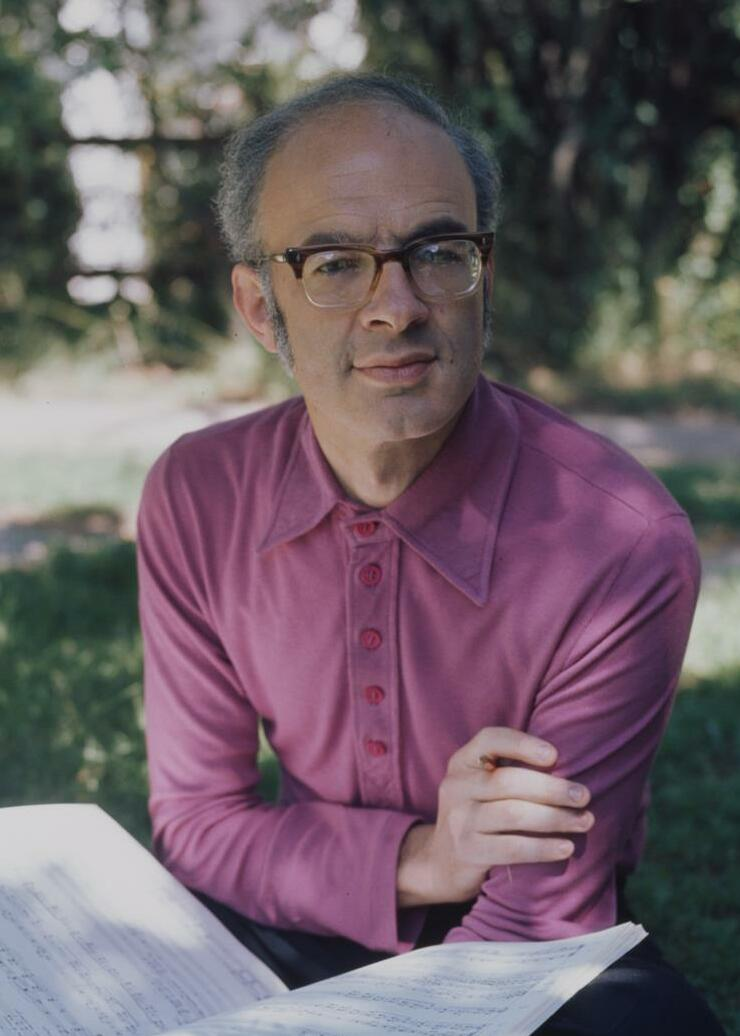
Dreyfus in 1972

George Dreyfus AM (born 22 July 1928) is an Australian contemporary classical, film and television composer.

== Early life and orchestral career ==
Dreyfus was born to a Jewish family in Elberfeld, Wuppertal, Germany. He was the younger of two sons born to Alfred Dreyfus and Hilde Ransenberg. Growing up, his family had what he described as "pots of money, cars, Kindermädchen [nannies] and holidays in Switzerland and Czechoslovakia". However, due to the Nazi persecution of Jews, the family was forced to move to Berlin in 1935 and then left Germany entirely. He and his brother arrived in Melbourne in July 1939 and began attending boarding school; his parents followed in December.

At Melbourne High School, Dreyfus conducted the school choir and played clarinet in the school orchestra. He enrolled in the Melbourne Conservatorium of Music as a bassoonist, and then in 1948 toured for a year playing Italian opera with the J. C. Williamson touring orchestra. Dreyfus subsequently played for several years in the house orchestra of His Majesty's Theatre, Perth. He joined the Melbourne Symphony Orchestra as a bassoonist in 1953, where he played until 1964. He was reputedly fired from the orchestra by the Australian conductor and composer Clive Douglas. A grant enabled him in 1955 to continue his studies at the Imperial Academy of Music in Vienna, where he was taught by Karl Öhlberger.

== Composer ==
Dreyfus began composing in 1956, but did not concentrate on composition until after he left the orchestra in the 1960s. A UNESCO travel grant allowed him in 1966 to travel to Germany for studies with Karlheinz Stockhausen at the Rheinische Musikschule in Cologne. In 1972 he won the Albert H. Maggs Composition Award.

He has composed numerous film and television scores, including for The Adventures of Sebastian the Fox (1963), A Steam Train Passes (1974), Rush (1974), Dimboola (1979) and The Fringe Dwellers (1986). It was the score for Rush which brought him wider recognition and saw him immortalised in the Trivial Pursuit board game.

He composed the operas Rathenau (premiered 1993 at the Staatstheater Kassel), Die Marx Sisters (premiered 1996 at the Bielefeld Opera) and The Takeover (1970) which had its European premiere in 1997 in Germany. Other operas are Garni Sands (1966, premiered 1972) and Gilt-Edged Kid (1970).

He also composed the musical The Sentimental Bloke, an adaptation of The Songs of a Sentimental Bloke with book and lyrics by Graeme Blundell. The Sentimental Bloke premiered at the Melbourne Theatre Company in December 1985. He also contributed music to Manning Clark's History of Australia – The Musical which premiered in 1988.

In 1984, he published his autobiography The Last Frivolous Book, and in 1998 a book of essays. His memoir Don't Ever Let Them Get You! (Black Pepper, 2009) includes essays on his music and a complete catalogue of works. In 2011 he published Brush Off! about his struggles with Opera Australia to get his opera Gilt-Edged Kid performed. In 2019, at the age of 90, Dreyfus disrupted the opening night of Rigoletto at the State Theatre in Melbourne when he attempted to use a megaphone from the front row to protest against the company for not having performed his work. He has received funding to deliver performances in Melbourne from The Pratt Foundation. He most recently performed at The Festival of Jewish Arts and Music, where at the age of 91 he is still performing the bassoon part in the arrangements he made for quartet.

== Honours and awards ==
=== ARIA Music Awards ===
The ARIA Music Awards is an annual awards ceremony that recognises excellence, innovation, and achievement across all genres of Australian music. They commenced in 1987.

Year	Nominee / work	Award	Result	Ref.
1989	Rush - The Adventures of Sebastian the Fox and Other Goodies	Best Classical Album	Nominated	

=== Don Banks Music Award ===
The Don Banks Music Award was established in 1984 to publicly honour a senior artist of high distinction who has made an outstanding and sustained contribution to music in Australia. It was founded by the Australia Council in honour of Don Banks, Australian composer, performer and the first chair of its music board.

Year	Nominee / work	Award	Result
1992	George Dreyfus	Don Banks Music Award	Won

He was recipient of the first Creative Arts Fellowship at the Australian National University in 1967.

Dreyfus' first composition, Trio for flute, clarinet and bassoon, Op. 1 (1956) won the APRA Serious Music Award in 1986.

In 1992 was made a Member of the Order of Australia for his services to music. In 2002 he was awarded the Bundesverdienstkreuz 1. Klasse. At the APRA Music Awards of 2013 he was recognised for his Distinguished Services to Australian Music.

== Personal life ==
External image
- George Dreyfus (1995) by Brian Dunlop

Dreyfus was first married to flautist Phyllis Todner. After their divorce, Dreyfus was then married to the academic and writer Kay Dreyfus. He has a son and a daughter, Federal Labor MP and Australian Attorney-General Mark Dreyfus, and Michelle Ball, a social worker by that first marriage, and by the second, a son, Jonathan Dreyfus, who has followed in his father's footsteps as a composer.

A portrait of George Dreyfus by artist Brian Dunlop was entered in the 1995 Archibald Prize competition.
