= Frank S. Tait =

Australian theatre entrepreneur

Sir Frank Samuel Tait (12 November 1883 – 23 August 1965) was an Australian theatre entrepreneur, managing director of J. C. Williamson's. He was the youngest of five Tait brothers, well known in Australia as show-business entrepreneurs and managers.

== History ==
Tait was born on 12 November 1883 in Richmond, Victoria, the youngest son of John Turnbull Tait, who in 1862 emigrated from Scotland to Victoria, Australia, where he married Sarah Victoria Leeming. They had children in Castlemaine, and one, Frank Samuel, in Melbourne. Tait attended Richmond State School and Melbourne Church of England Grammar School.

He became general manager of J. C. Williamson Theatres in 1914.

In February 1921 J. C. Williamson's Ltd created an additional 75,000 shares in the company, issued to the brothers John Henry Tait, Edward Joseph Tait, James Nevin Tait, and Frank Samuel Tait, trading as "J & N Tait", for £1 each. Tait was appointed a director of JCW around the same time.

He was co-founder in 1935 and co-proprietor of Village Theatre Ltd. with Hirsch Krantz, John Henry Tait, Karl Millbrook and Jascha Spivakosky, co-directors. Connection or otherwise with Village Roadshow or Village Cinemas has not been found.

In June 1938 Australian and New Zealand Theatres Ltd. was founded to control the assets of J. C. Williamsons. Initially G. B. Dean, S. S. Crick, and Frank Tait served as joint managing directors, then around 1940 he became the managing director of Australian and New Zealand Theatres Ltd.

== Later life and legacy ==
Tait was knighted in 1956 for services to the theatre and died in Portsea, Victoria on 23 August 1965, aged 81.

The Tait Memorial Trust, instituted in 1992, was named in his honour.

== Family ==
Tait married twice; firstly, on 29 November 1913 to Iris Olga Field Barnard; and secondly, on 16 August 1941 to the soprano Viola Wilson Hogg a.k.a. Viola Wilson. They had a residence in Hopetoun Road, Toorak, Victoria. His children include Joan Iris Tait, Peggy Elfrida Tait, Peter Frank Tait, Ruth Emelie Tait, Isla Violet Tait OAM, (Viola) Anne Tait and Sally Tait.

Brothers of Frank S. Tait include:

- Charles Tait
- John Henry Tait
- James Nevin Tait
- Edward Joseph Tait

Stage people gave nicknames to the young Tait brothers: "Agitate" (J. H. Tait), "Irritate" (J. N. Tait), "Hesitate" (E. J. Tait), and "Cogitate" (F. S. Tait).
